

177001–177100 

|-bgcolor=#E9E9E9
| 177001 ||  || — || January 5, 2003 || Socorro || LINEAR || CLO || align=right | 3.7 km || 
|-id=002 bgcolor=#d6d6d6
| 177002 ||  || — || January 5, 2003 || Socorro || LINEAR || — || align=right | 6.2 km || 
|-id=003 bgcolor=#fefefe
| 177003 ||  || — || January 7, 2003 || Socorro || LINEAR || H || align=right | 1.0 km || 
|-id=004 bgcolor=#E9E9E9
| 177004 ||  || — || January 7, 2003 || Socorro || LINEAR || — || align=right | 3.2 km || 
|-id=005 bgcolor=#d6d6d6
| 177005 ||  || — || January 14, 2003 || Socorro || LINEAR || — || align=right | 6.0 km || 
|-id=006 bgcolor=#d6d6d6
| 177006 || 2003 BO || — || January 24, 2003 || Palomar || NEAT || — || align=right | 5.9 km || 
|-id=007 bgcolor=#d6d6d6
| 177007 ||  || — || January 23, 2003 || Kitt Peak || Spacewatch || — || align=right | 4.7 km || 
|-id=008 bgcolor=#d6d6d6
| 177008 ||  || — || January 25, 2003 || Anderson Mesa || LONEOS || — || align=right | 4.5 km || 
|-id=009 bgcolor=#d6d6d6
| 177009 ||  || — || January 26, 2003 || Kitt Peak || Spacewatch || — || align=right | 3.3 km || 
|-id=010 bgcolor=#d6d6d6
| 177010 ||  || — || January 26, 2003 || Anderson Mesa || LONEOS || JLI || align=right | 5.3 km || 
|-id=011 bgcolor=#E9E9E9
| 177011 ||  || — || January 26, 2003 || Anderson Mesa || LONEOS || — || align=right | 5.3 km || 
|-id=012 bgcolor=#d6d6d6
| 177012 ||  || — || January 25, 2003 || Palomar || NEAT || — || align=right | 4.8 km || 
|-id=013 bgcolor=#d6d6d6
| 177013 ||  || — || January 26, 2003 || Anderson Mesa || LONEOS || TEL || align=right | 2.1 km || 
|-id=014 bgcolor=#E9E9E9
| 177014 ||  || — || January 27, 2003 || Palomar || NEAT || — || align=right | 3.5 km || 
|-id=015 bgcolor=#d6d6d6
| 177015 ||  || — || January 26, 2003 || Haleakala || NEAT || — || align=right | 3.2 km || 
|-id=016 bgcolor=#FFC2E0
| 177016 ||  || — || January 31, 2003 || Kitt Peak || Spacewatch || APO || align=right data-sort-value="0.39" | 390 m || 
|-id=017 bgcolor=#E9E9E9
| 177017 ||  || — || January 26, 2003 || Haleakala || NEAT || — || align=right | 4.5 km || 
|-id=018 bgcolor=#d6d6d6
| 177018 ||  || — || January 27, 2003 || Socorro || LINEAR || — || align=right | 5.3 km || 
|-id=019 bgcolor=#d6d6d6
| 177019 ||  || — || January 27, 2003 || Socorro || LINEAR || — || align=right | 3.4 km || 
|-id=020 bgcolor=#d6d6d6
| 177020 ||  || — || January 28, 2003 || Socorro || LINEAR || ALA || align=right | 6.8 km || 
|-id=021 bgcolor=#E9E9E9
| 177021 ||  || — || January 30, 2003 || Socorro || LINEAR || — || align=right | 4.7 km || 
|-id=022 bgcolor=#d6d6d6
| 177022 ||  || — || January 29, 2003 || Palomar || NEAT || LAU || align=right | 1.4 km || 
|-id=023 bgcolor=#d6d6d6
| 177023 ||  || — || January 31, 2003 || Socorro || LINEAR || EOS || align=right | 2.9 km || 
|-id=024 bgcolor=#fefefe
| 177024 ||  || — || January 31, 2003 || Anderson Mesa || LONEOS || H || align=right data-sort-value="0.84" | 840 m || 
|-id=025 bgcolor=#d6d6d6
| 177025 ||  || — || January 30, 2003 || Anderson Mesa || LONEOS || — || align=right | 3.2 km || 
|-id=026 bgcolor=#E9E9E9
| 177026 ||  || — || January 31, 2003 || Socorro || LINEAR || — || align=right | 4.1 km || 
|-id=027 bgcolor=#d6d6d6
| 177027 ||  || — || January 30, 2003 || Haleakala || NEAT || — || align=right | 4.3 km || 
|-id=028 bgcolor=#d6d6d6
| 177028 ||  || — || January 31, 2003 || Socorro || LINEAR || — || align=right | 3.0 km || 
|-id=029 bgcolor=#E9E9E9
| 177029 ||  || — || January 31, 2003 || Socorro || LINEAR || — || align=right | 4.4 km || 
|-id=030 bgcolor=#E9E9E9
| 177030 ||  || — || January 31, 2003 || Socorro || LINEAR || — || align=right | 3.4 km || 
|-id=031 bgcolor=#d6d6d6
| 177031 ||  || — || January 28, 2003 || Socorro || LINEAR || — || align=right | 4.6 km || 
|-id=032 bgcolor=#E9E9E9
| 177032 ||  || — || February 1, 2003 || Socorro || LINEAR || NEM || align=right | 4.8 km || 
|-id=033 bgcolor=#d6d6d6
| 177033 ||  || — || February 1, 2003 || Socorro || LINEAR || — || align=right | 5.4 km || 
|-id=034 bgcolor=#E9E9E9
| 177034 ||  || — || February 1, 2003 || Socorro || LINEAR || EUN || align=right | 2.3 km || 
|-id=035 bgcolor=#d6d6d6
| 177035 ||  || — || February 1, 2003 || Socorro || LINEAR || — || align=right | 6.8 km || 
|-id=036 bgcolor=#d6d6d6
| 177036 ||  || — || February 1, 2003 || Kitt Peak || Spacewatch || — || align=right | 3.1 km || 
|-id=037 bgcolor=#E9E9E9
| 177037 ||  || — || February 3, 2003 || Anderson Mesa || LONEOS || — || align=right | 4.1 km || 
|-id=038 bgcolor=#d6d6d6
| 177038 ||  || — || February 4, 2003 || Kitt Peak || Spacewatch || HYG || align=right | 4.6 km || 
|-id=039 bgcolor=#d6d6d6
| 177039 ||  || — || February 19, 2003 || Palomar || NEAT || YAK || align=right | 3.8 km || 
|-id=040 bgcolor=#FA8072
| 177040 ||  || — || February 23, 2003 || Campo Imperatore || CINEOS || H || align=right | 1.0 km || 
|-id=041 bgcolor=#fefefe
| 177041 ||  || — || February 23, 2003 || Socorro || LINEAR || H || align=right | 1.2 km || 
|-id=042 bgcolor=#d6d6d6
| 177042 ||  || — || February 25, 2003 || Campo Imperatore || CINEOS || CRO || align=right | 5.8 km || 
|-id=043 bgcolor=#d6d6d6
| 177043 ||  || — || February 19, 2003 || Palomar || NEAT || — || align=right | 4.2 km || 
|-id=044 bgcolor=#d6d6d6
| 177044 ||  || — || February 28, 2003 || Haleakala || NEAT || — || align=right | 3.0 km || 
|-id=045 bgcolor=#d6d6d6
| 177045 ||  || — || February 22, 2003 || Palomar || NEAT || HYG || align=right | 4.1 km || 
|-id=046 bgcolor=#d6d6d6
| 177046 ||  || — || March 5, 2003 || Socorro || LINEAR || — || align=right | 4.5 km || 
|-id=047 bgcolor=#d6d6d6
| 177047 ||  || — || March 5, 2003 || Socorro || LINEAR || — || align=right | 6.6 km || 
|-id=048 bgcolor=#d6d6d6
| 177048 ||  || — || March 6, 2003 || Anderson Mesa || LONEOS || — || align=right | 3.7 km || 
|-id=049 bgcolor=#FFC2E0
| 177049 ||  || — || March 8, 2003 || Kitt Peak || Spacewatch || APOPHA || align=right data-sort-value="0.39" | 390 m || 
|-id=050 bgcolor=#d6d6d6
| 177050 ||  || — || March 6, 2003 || Anderson Mesa || LONEOS || — || align=right | 3.8 km || 
|-id=051 bgcolor=#d6d6d6
| 177051 ||  || — || March 6, 2003 || Anderson Mesa || LONEOS || — || align=right | 4.7 km || 
|-id=052 bgcolor=#d6d6d6
| 177052 ||  || — || March 6, 2003 || Socorro || LINEAR || — || align=right | 3.8 km || 
|-id=053 bgcolor=#d6d6d6
| 177053 ||  || — || March 6, 2003 || Anderson Mesa || LONEOS || — || align=right | 3.5 km || 
|-id=054 bgcolor=#d6d6d6
| 177054 ||  || — || March 7, 2003 || Anderson Mesa || LONEOS || THM || align=right | 3.6 km || 
|-id=055 bgcolor=#d6d6d6
| 177055 ||  || — || March 8, 2003 || Socorro || LINEAR || — || align=right | 4.8 km || 
|-id=056 bgcolor=#E9E9E9
| 177056 ||  || — || March 8, 2003 || Socorro || LINEAR || — || align=right | 4.0 km || 
|-id=057 bgcolor=#d6d6d6
| 177057 ||  || — || March 7, 2003 || Socorro || LINEAR || — || align=right | 6.2 km || 
|-id=058 bgcolor=#d6d6d6
| 177058 ||  || — || March 11, 2003 || Palomar || NEAT || — || align=right | 6.9 km || 
|-id=059 bgcolor=#d6d6d6
| 177059 ||  || — || March 11, 2003 || Palomar || NEAT || — || align=right | 3.8 km || 
|-id=060 bgcolor=#d6d6d6
| 177060 ||  || — || March 11, 2003 || Socorro || LINEAR || — || align=right | 5.5 km || 
|-id=061 bgcolor=#d6d6d6
| 177061 ||  || — || March 12, 2003 || Palomar || NEAT || EUP || align=right | 7.6 km || 
|-id=062 bgcolor=#fefefe
| 177062 ||  || — || March 24, 2003 || Socorro || LINEAR || H || align=right data-sort-value="0.84" | 840 m || 
|-id=063 bgcolor=#fefefe
| 177063 ||  || — || March 24, 2003 || Socorro || LINEAR || H || align=right | 1.1 km || 
|-id=064 bgcolor=#d6d6d6
| 177064 ||  || — || March 26, 2003 || Socorro || LINEAR || EUP || align=right | 8.5 km || 
|-id=065 bgcolor=#d6d6d6
| 177065 Samuelnoah ||  ||  || March 30, 2003 || Wrightwood || J. W. Young || — || align=right | 3.4 km || 
|-id=066 bgcolor=#d6d6d6
| 177066 ||  || — || March 30, 2003 || Socorro || LINEAR || — || align=right | 7.2 km || 
|-id=067 bgcolor=#d6d6d6
| 177067 ||  || — || March 23, 2003 || Catalina || CSS || — || align=right | 4.7 km || 
|-id=068 bgcolor=#d6d6d6
| 177068 ||  || — || March 24, 2003 || Kitt Peak || Spacewatch || THM || align=right | 2.9 km || 
|-id=069 bgcolor=#d6d6d6
| 177069 ||  || — || March 25, 2003 || Palomar || NEAT || — || align=right | 6.5 km || 
|-id=070 bgcolor=#d6d6d6
| 177070 ||  || — || March 23, 2003 || Kitt Peak || Spacewatch || — || align=right | 3.1 km || 
|-id=071 bgcolor=#d6d6d6
| 177071 ||  || — || March 25, 2003 || Catalina || CSS || — || align=right | 6.9 km || 
|-id=072 bgcolor=#d6d6d6
| 177072 ||  || — || March 23, 2003 || Kitt Peak || Spacewatch || THM || align=right | 3.5 km || 
|-id=073 bgcolor=#d6d6d6
| 177073 ||  || — || March 23, 2003 || Kitt Peak || Spacewatch || — || align=right | 2.6 km || 
|-id=074 bgcolor=#d6d6d6
| 177074 ||  || — || March 23, 2003 || Kitt Peak || Spacewatch || — || align=right | 5.1 km || 
|-id=075 bgcolor=#d6d6d6
| 177075 ||  || — || March 23, 2003 || Kitt Peak || Spacewatch || — || align=right | 3.9 km || 
|-id=076 bgcolor=#d6d6d6
| 177076 ||  || — || March 23, 2003 || Catalina || CSS || — || align=right | 3.6 km || 
|-id=077 bgcolor=#d6d6d6
| 177077 ||  || — || March 24, 2003 || Kitt Peak || Spacewatch || — || align=right | 3.5 km || 
|-id=078 bgcolor=#d6d6d6
| 177078 ||  || — || March 24, 2003 || Kitt Peak || Spacewatch || — || align=right | 4.3 km || 
|-id=079 bgcolor=#d6d6d6
| 177079 ||  || — || March 24, 2003 || Kitt Peak || Spacewatch || — || align=right | 3.9 km || 
|-id=080 bgcolor=#d6d6d6
| 177080 ||  || — || March 24, 2003 || Haleakala || NEAT || — || align=right | 5.2 km || 
|-id=081 bgcolor=#d6d6d6
| 177081 ||  || — || March 25, 2003 || Palomar || NEAT || — || align=right | 6.4 km || 
|-id=082 bgcolor=#d6d6d6
| 177082 ||  || — || March 26, 2003 || Palomar || NEAT || — || align=right | 5.7 km || 
|-id=083 bgcolor=#d6d6d6
| 177083 ||  || — || March 26, 2003 || Palomar || NEAT || — || align=right | 3.5 km || 
|-id=084 bgcolor=#d6d6d6
| 177084 ||  || — || March 26, 2003 || Palomar || NEAT || — || align=right | 3.6 km || 
|-id=085 bgcolor=#d6d6d6
| 177085 ||  || — || March 26, 2003 || Palomar || NEAT || — || align=right | 4.3 km || 
|-id=086 bgcolor=#d6d6d6
| 177086 ||  || — || March 26, 2003 || Palomar || NEAT || — || align=right | 6.0 km || 
|-id=087 bgcolor=#d6d6d6
| 177087 ||  || — || March 26, 2003 || Kitt Peak || Spacewatch || HYG || align=right | 4.0 km || 
|-id=088 bgcolor=#d6d6d6
| 177088 ||  || — || March 26, 2003 || Palomar || NEAT || — || align=right | 4.6 km || 
|-id=089 bgcolor=#d6d6d6
| 177089 ||  || — || March 26, 2003 || Haleakala || NEAT || URS || align=right | 4.9 km || 
|-id=090 bgcolor=#d6d6d6
| 177090 ||  || — || March 26, 2003 || Palomar || NEAT || ALA || align=right | 6.2 km || 
|-id=091 bgcolor=#d6d6d6
| 177091 ||  || — || March 26, 2003 || Haleakala || NEAT || EOS || align=right | 3.6 km || 
|-id=092 bgcolor=#d6d6d6
| 177092 ||  || — || March 26, 2003 || Haleakala || NEAT || THB || align=right | 5.9 km || 
|-id=093 bgcolor=#d6d6d6
| 177093 ||  || — || March 27, 2003 || Palomar || NEAT || — || align=right | 5.8 km || 
|-id=094 bgcolor=#d6d6d6
| 177094 ||  || — || March 27, 2003 || Socorro || LINEAR || — || align=right | 4.9 km || 
|-id=095 bgcolor=#d6d6d6
| 177095 ||  || — || March 28, 2003 || Kitt Peak || Spacewatch || — || align=right | 5.6 km || 
|-id=096 bgcolor=#d6d6d6
| 177096 ||  || — || March 29, 2003 || Anderson Mesa || LONEOS || EOS || align=right | 4.3 km || 
|-id=097 bgcolor=#d6d6d6
| 177097 ||  || — || March 29, 2003 || Anderson Mesa || LONEOS || — || align=right | 6.2 km || 
|-id=098 bgcolor=#d6d6d6
| 177098 ||  || — || March 29, 2003 || Anderson Mesa || LONEOS || LIX || align=right | 6.4 km || 
|-id=099 bgcolor=#d6d6d6
| 177099 ||  || — || March 30, 2003 || Kitt Peak || Spacewatch || — || align=right | 4.8 km || 
|-id=100 bgcolor=#d6d6d6
| 177100 ||  || — || March 30, 2003 || Socorro || LINEAR || — || align=right | 4.7 km || 
|}

177101–177200 

|-bgcolor=#d6d6d6
| 177101 ||  || — || March 31, 2003 || Socorro || LINEAR || — || align=right | 4.5 km || 
|-id=102 bgcolor=#d6d6d6
| 177102 ||  || — || March 31, 2003 || Socorro || LINEAR || — || align=right | 5.5 km || 
|-id=103 bgcolor=#d6d6d6
| 177103 ||  || — || March 31, 2003 || Socorro || LINEAR || — || align=right | 4.0 km || 
|-id=104 bgcolor=#d6d6d6
| 177104 ||  || — || March 31, 2003 || Socorro || LINEAR || — || align=right | 6.4 km || 
|-id=105 bgcolor=#d6d6d6
| 177105 ||  || — || March 25, 2003 || Anderson Mesa || LONEOS || — || align=right | 5.1 km || 
|-id=106 bgcolor=#d6d6d6
| 177106 ||  || — || March 24, 2003 || Kitt Peak || Spacewatch || — || align=right | 3.3 km || 
|-id=107 bgcolor=#d6d6d6
| 177107 ||  || — || March 24, 2003 || Kitt Peak || Spacewatch || THM || align=right | 3.8 km || 
|-id=108 bgcolor=#d6d6d6
| 177108 ||  || — || March 22, 2003 || Haleakala || NEAT || — || align=right | 4.7 km || 
|-id=109 bgcolor=#d6d6d6
| 177109 ||  || — || April 1, 2003 || Socorro || LINEAR || — || align=right | 6.1 km || 
|-id=110 bgcolor=#d6d6d6
| 177110 ||  || — || April 1, 2003 || Socorro || LINEAR || — || align=right | 6.1 km || 
|-id=111 bgcolor=#d6d6d6
| 177111 ||  || — || April 1, 2003 || Socorro || LINEAR || HYG || align=right | 4.2 km || 
|-id=112 bgcolor=#d6d6d6
| 177112 ||  || — || April 3, 2003 || Haleakala || NEAT || TIR || align=right | 4.6 km || 
|-id=113 bgcolor=#d6d6d6
| 177113 ||  || — || April 1, 2003 || Socorro || LINEAR || LIX || align=right | 7.8 km || 
|-id=114 bgcolor=#d6d6d6
| 177114 ||  || — || April 2, 2003 || Haleakala || NEAT || ARM || align=right | 6.6 km || 
|-id=115 bgcolor=#d6d6d6
| 177115 ||  || — || April 3, 2003 || Haleakala || NEAT || — || align=right | 4.3 km || 
|-id=116 bgcolor=#d6d6d6
| 177116 ||  || — || April 6, 2003 || Kitt Peak || Spacewatch || — || align=right | 4.6 km || 
|-id=117 bgcolor=#d6d6d6
| 177117 ||  || — || April 7, 2003 || Kitt Peak || Spacewatch || — || align=right | 3.5 km || 
|-id=118 bgcolor=#d6d6d6
| 177118 ||  || — || April 7, 2003 || Socorro || LINEAR || EUP || align=right | 7.6 km || 
|-id=119 bgcolor=#d6d6d6
| 177119 ||  || — || April 7, 2003 || Kitt Peak || Spacewatch || — || align=right | 3.4 km || 
|-id=120 bgcolor=#d6d6d6
| 177120 Ocampo Uría ||  ||  || April 1, 2003 || Kitt Peak || M. W. Buie || — || align=right | 3.7 km || 
|-id=121 bgcolor=#d6d6d6
| 177121 ||  || — || April 6, 2003 || Kitt Peak || Spacewatch || — || align=right | 6.2 km || 
|-id=122 bgcolor=#d6d6d6
| 177122 ||  || — || April 24, 2003 || Anderson Mesa || LONEOS || — || align=right | 4.3 km || 
|-id=123 bgcolor=#d6d6d6
| 177123 ||  || — || April 21, 2003 || Kitt Peak || Spacewatch || — || align=right | 4.6 km || 
|-id=124 bgcolor=#d6d6d6
| 177124 ||  || — || April 25, 2003 || Kitt Peak || Spacewatch || — || align=right | 5.3 km || 
|-id=125 bgcolor=#d6d6d6
| 177125 ||  || — || April 24, 2003 || Kitt Peak || Spacewatch || — || align=right | 3.6 km || 
|-id=126 bgcolor=#d6d6d6
| 177126 ||  || — || April 25, 2003 || Campo Imperatore || CINEOS || — || align=right | 4.9 km || 
|-id=127 bgcolor=#d6d6d6
| 177127 ||  || — || April 24, 2003 || Anderson Mesa || LONEOS || — || align=right | 6.1 km || 
|-id=128 bgcolor=#d6d6d6
| 177128 ||  || — || April 25, 2003 || Kitt Peak || Spacewatch || SAN || align=right | 2.3 km || 
|-id=129 bgcolor=#d6d6d6
| 177129 ||  || — || April 28, 2003 || Kitt Peak || Spacewatch || VER || align=right | 5.5 km || 
|-id=130 bgcolor=#d6d6d6
| 177130 ||  || — || April 29, 2003 || Anderson Mesa || LONEOS || — || align=right | 4.5 km || 
|-id=131 bgcolor=#d6d6d6
| 177131 ||  || — || April 30, 2003 || Kitt Peak || Spacewatch || — || align=right | 3.5 km || 
|-id=132 bgcolor=#d6d6d6
| 177132 ||  || — || April 24, 2003 || Kitt Peak || Spacewatch || — || align=right | 5.5 km || 
|-id=133 bgcolor=#d6d6d6
| 177133 ||  || — || May 2, 2003 || Kitt Peak || Spacewatch || — || align=right | 3.1 km || 
|-id=134 bgcolor=#d6d6d6
| 177134 ||  || — || May 7, 2003 || Catalina || CSS || — || align=right | 5.2 km || 
|-id=135 bgcolor=#d6d6d6
| 177135 ||  || — || May 25, 2003 || Kitt Peak || Spacewatch || — || align=right | 4.6 km || 
|-id=136 bgcolor=#d6d6d6
| 177136 ||  || — || May 26, 2003 || Haleakala || NEAT || — || align=right | 4.7 km || 
|-id=137 bgcolor=#fefefe
| 177137 ||  || — || August 4, 2003 || Socorro || LINEAR || NYS || align=right data-sort-value="0.90" | 900 m || 
|-id=138 bgcolor=#fefefe
| 177138 ||  || — || August 18, 2003 || Campo Imperatore || CINEOS || FLO || align=right data-sort-value="0.95" | 950 m || 
|-id=139 bgcolor=#fefefe
| 177139 ||  || — || August 22, 2003 || Socorro || LINEAR || MAS || align=right | 1.4 km || 
|-id=140 bgcolor=#fefefe
| 177140 ||  || — || August 22, 2003 || Palomar || NEAT || — || align=right | 1.2 km || 
|-id=141 bgcolor=#fefefe
| 177141 ||  || — || August 22, 2003 || Socorro || LINEAR || — || align=right | 1.1 km || 
|-id=142 bgcolor=#fefefe
| 177142 ||  || — || August 22, 2003 || Palomar || NEAT || — || align=right | 1.1 km || 
|-id=143 bgcolor=#fefefe
| 177143 ||  || — || August 23, 2003 || Socorro || LINEAR || NYS || align=right data-sort-value="0.94" | 940 m || 
|-id=144 bgcolor=#fefefe
| 177144 ||  || — || August 23, 2003 || Socorro || LINEAR || — || align=right | 1.3 km || 
|-id=145 bgcolor=#fefefe
| 177145 ||  || — || August 24, 2003 || Socorro || LINEAR || ERI || align=right | 3.0 km || 
|-id=146 bgcolor=#fefefe
| 177146 ||  || — || August 24, 2003 || Socorro || LINEAR || — || align=right | 1.1 km || 
|-id=147 bgcolor=#fefefe
| 177147 ||  || — || August 25, 2003 || Socorro || LINEAR || FLO || align=right | 1.00 km || 
|-id=148 bgcolor=#fefefe
| 177148 Pätzold ||  ||  || August 24, 2003 || Cerro Tololo || M. W. Buie || — || align=right | 1.1 km || 
|-id=149 bgcolor=#fefefe
| 177149 ||  || — || August 30, 2003 || Haleakala || NEAT || — || align=right | 1.3 km || 
|-id=150 bgcolor=#fefefe
| 177150 || 2003 RR || — || September 2, 2003 || Socorro || LINEAR || — || align=right | 1.1 km || 
|-id=151 bgcolor=#fefefe
| 177151 ||  || — || September 2, 2003 || Socorro || LINEAR || — || align=right | 1.8 km || 
|-id=152 bgcolor=#fefefe
| 177152 ||  || — || September 15, 2003 || Anderson Mesa || LONEOS || NYS || align=right data-sort-value="0.88" | 880 m || 
|-id=153 bgcolor=#fefefe
| 177153 ||  || — || September 16, 2003 || Kitt Peak || Spacewatch || — || align=right | 1.1 km || 
|-id=154 bgcolor=#fefefe
| 177154 ||  || — || September 17, 2003 || Goodricke-Pigott || R. A. Tucker || — || align=right | 1.3 km || 
|-id=155 bgcolor=#fefefe
| 177155 ||  || — || September 16, 2003 || Kitt Peak || Spacewatch || — || align=right | 1.3 km || 
|-id=156 bgcolor=#fefefe
| 177156 ||  || — || September 18, 2003 || Kitt Peak || Spacewatch || — || align=right data-sort-value="0.81" | 810 m || 
|-id=157 bgcolor=#fefefe
| 177157 ||  || — || September 18, 2003 || Piszkéstető || K. Sárneczky, B. Sipőcz || NYS || align=right data-sort-value="0.86" | 860 m || 
|-id=158 bgcolor=#fefefe
| 177158 ||  || — || September 16, 2003 || Palomar || NEAT || FLO || align=right data-sort-value="0.94" | 940 m || 
|-id=159 bgcolor=#fefefe
| 177159 ||  || — || September 16, 2003 || Anderson Mesa || LONEOS || — || align=right | 1.3 km || 
|-id=160 bgcolor=#fefefe
| 177160 ||  || — || September 18, 2003 || Palomar || NEAT || — || align=right data-sort-value="0.93" | 930 m || 
|-id=161 bgcolor=#fefefe
| 177161 ||  || — || September 20, 2003 || Haleakala || NEAT || — || align=right data-sort-value="0.95" | 950 m || 
|-id=162 bgcolor=#fefefe
| 177162 ||  || — || September 19, 2003 || Socorro || LINEAR || — || align=right | 1.1 km || 
|-id=163 bgcolor=#fefefe
| 177163 ||  || — || September 20, 2003 || Palomar || NEAT || — || align=right | 2.1 km || 
|-id=164 bgcolor=#fefefe
| 177164 ||  || — || September 19, 2003 || Socorro || LINEAR || FLO || align=right data-sort-value="0.98" | 980 m || 
|-id=165 bgcolor=#fefefe
| 177165 ||  || — || September 20, 2003 || Socorro || LINEAR || — || align=right | 1.3 km || 
|-id=166 bgcolor=#fefefe
| 177166 ||  || — || September 20, 2003 || Socorro || LINEAR || — || align=right | 1.1 km || 
|-id=167 bgcolor=#fefefe
| 177167 ||  || — || September 20, 2003 || Socorro || LINEAR || — || align=right | 1.5 km || 
|-id=168 bgcolor=#fefefe
| 177168 ||  || — || September 20, 2003 || Palomar || NEAT || V || align=right | 1.4 km || 
|-id=169 bgcolor=#fefefe
| 177169 ||  || — || September 21, 2003 || Haleakala || NEAT || — || align=right | 1.00 km || 
|-id=170 bgcolor=#fefefe
| 177170 ||  || — || September 20, 2003 || Palomar || NEAT || V || align=right | 1.1 km || 
|-id=171 bgcolor=#fefefe
| 177171 ||  || — || September 20, 2003 || Haleakala || NEAT || — || align=right | 1.2 km || 
|-id=172 bgcolor=#E9E9E9
| 177172 ||  || — || September 20, 2003 || Palomar || NEAT || EUN || align=right | 1.9 km || 
|-id=173 bgcolor=#fefefe
| 177173 ||  || — || September 20, 2003 || Anderson Mesa || LONEOS || — || align=right | 1.2 km || 
|-id=174 bgcolor=#fefefe
| 177174 ||  || — || September 23, 2003 || Haleakala || NEAT || — || align=right | 1.3 km || 
|-id=175 bgcolor=#fefefe
| 177175 ||  || — || September 21, 2003 || Uccle || T. Pauwels || — || align=right | 1.4 km || 
|-id=176 bgcolor=#fefefe
| 177176 ||  || — || September 18, 2003 || Kitt Peak || Spacewatch || — || align=right | 1.2 km || 
|-id=177 bgcolor=#fefefe
| 177177 ||  || — || September 22, 2003 || Socorro || LINEAR || — || align=right | 1.8 km || 
|-id=178 bgcolor=#fefefe
| 177178 ||  || — || September 27, 2003 || Kitt Peak || Spacewatch || — || align=right | 1.0 km || 
|-id=179 bgcolor=#fefefe
| 177179 ||  || — || September 25, 2003 || Bergisch Gladbach || W. Bickel || — || align=right | 1.2 km || 
|-id=180 bgcolor=#fefefe
| 177180 ||  || — || September 26, 2003 || Socorro || LINEAR || — || align=right data-sort-value="0.89" | 890 m || 
|-id=181 bgcolor=#fefefe
| 177181 ||  || — || September 26, 2003 || Socorro || LINEAR || — || align=right data-sort-value="0.92" | 920 m || 
|-id=182 bgcolor=#fefefe
| 177182 ||  || — || September 26, 2003 || Socorro || LINEAR || NYS || align=right | 3.2 km || 
|-id=183 bgcolor=#fefefe
| 177183 ||  || — || September 28, 2003 || Socorro || LINEAR || — || align=right | 1.7 km || 
|-id=184 bgcolor=#fefefe
| 177184 ||  || — || September 28, 2003 || Kitt Peak || Spacewatch || — || align=right | 1.00 km || 
|-id=185 bgcolor=#fefefe
| 177185 ||  || — || October 3, 2003 || Kitt Peak || Spacewatch || — || align=right | 1.2 km || 
|-id=186 bgcolor=#fefefe
| 177186 ||  || — || October 14, 2003 || Anderson Mesa || LONEOS || — || align=right data-sort-value="0.86" | 860 m || 
|-id=187 bgcolor=#fefefe
| 177187 ||  || — || October 15, 2003 || Anderson Mesa || LONEOS || V || align=right data-sort-value="0.95" | 950 m || 
|-id=188 bgcolor=#fefefe
| 177188 ||  || — || October 16, 2003 || Kitt Peak || Spacewatch || — || align=right | 1.00 km || 
|-id=189 bgcolor=#fefefe
| 177189 ||  || — || October 17, 2003 || Socorro || LINEAR || PHO || align=right | 1.8 km || 
|-id=190 bgcolor=#fefefe
| 177190 ||  || — || October 19, 2003 || Kitt Peak || Spacewatch || — || align=right data-sort-value="0.69" | 690 m || 
|-id=191 bgcolor=#fefefe
| 177191 ||  || — || October 20, 2003 || Emerald Lane || L. Ball || — || align=right | 1.2 km || 
|-id=192 bgcolor=#fefefe
| 177192 ||  || — || October 16, 2003 || Kitt Peak || Spacewatch || — || align=right | 1.6 km || 
|-id=193 bgcolor=#fefefe
| 177193 ||  || — || October 16, 2003 || Anderson Mesa || LONEOS || — || align=right | 1.2 km || 
|-id=194 bgcolor=#fefefe
| 177194 ||  || — || October 17, 2003 || Črni Vrh || Črni Vrh || — || align=right | 1.6 km || 
|-id=195 bgcolor=#E9E9E9
| 177195 ||  || — || October 23, 2003 || Kvistaberg || UDAS || — || align=right | 1.4 km || 
|-id=196 bgcolor=#fefefe
| 177196 ||  || — || October 17, 2003 || Kitt Peak || Spacewatch || — || align=right | 1.1 km || 
|-id=197 bgcolor=#fefefe
| 177197 ||  || — || October 16, 2003 || Uccle || T. Pauwels || NYS || align=right data-sort-value="0.98" | 980 m || 
|-id=198 bgcolor=#fefefe
| 177198 ||  || — || October 16, 2003 || Anderson Mesa || LONEOS || NYS || align=right | 1.8 km || 
|-id=199 bgcolor=#fefefe
| 177199 ||  || — || October 18, 2003 || Palomar || NEAT || V || align=right data-sort-value="0.90" | 900 m || 
|-id=200 bgcolor=#fefefe
| 177200 ||  || — || October 18, 2003 || Palomar || NEAT || — || align=right | 1.4 km || 
|}

177201–177300 

|-bgcolor=#fefefe
| 177201 ||  || — || October 18, 2003 || Palomar || NEAT || — || align=right | 1.2 km || 
|-id=202 bgcolor=#fefefe
| 177202 ||  || — || October 20, 2003 || Socorro || LINEAR || — || align=right | 1.2 km || 
|-id=203 bgcolor=#fefefe
| 177203 ||  || — || October 20, 2003 || Palomar || NEAT || FLO || align=right | 1.2 km || 
|-id=204 bgcolor=#fefefe
| 177204 ||  || — || October 18, 2003 || Palomar || NEAT || FLO || align=right | 1.0 km || 
|-id=205 bgcolor=#fefefe
| 177205 ||  || — || October 19, 2003 || Kitt Peak || Spacewatch || NYS || align=right | 2.7 km || 
|-id=206 bgcolor=#fefefe
| 177206 ||  || — || October 20, 2003 || Kitt Peak || Spacewatch || NYS || align=right | 1.1 km || 
|-id=207 bgcolor=#fefefe
| 177207 ||  || — || October 18, 2003 || Kitt Peak || Spacewatch || — || align=right | 1.1 km || 
|-id=208 bgcolor=#fefefe
| 177208 ||  || — || October 19, 2003 || Kitt Peak || Spacewatch || V || align=right data-sort-value="0.85" | 850 m || 
|-id=209 bgcolor=#fefefe
| 177209 ||  || — || October 21, 2003 || Socorro || LINEAR || — || align=right | 1.4 km || 
|-id=210 bgcolor=#fefefe
| 177210 ||  || — || October 20, 2003 || Palomar || NEAT || — || align=right | 1.2 km || 
|-id=211 bgcolor=#fefefe
| 177211 ||  || — || October 17, 2003 || Campo Imperatore || CINEOS || FLO || align=right | 1.5 km || 
|-id=212 bgcolor=#E9E9E9
| 177212 ||  || — || October 18, 2003 || Anderson Mesa || LONEOS || — || align=right | 3.4 km || 
|-id=213 bgcolor=#fefefe
| 177213 ||  || — || October 18, 2003 || Kitt Peak || Spacewatch || FLO || align=right | 1.1 km || 
|-id=214 bgcolor=#fefefe
| 177214 ||  || — || October 20, 2003 || Kitt Peak || Spacewatch || — || align=right | 1.0 km || 
|-id=215 bgcolor=#fefefe
| 177215 ||  || — || October 20, 2003 || Kitt Peak || Spacewatch || NYS || align=right data-sort-value="0.86" | 860 m || 
|-id=216 bgcolor=#fefefe
| 177216 ||  || — || October 21, 2003 || Palomar || NEAT || — || align=right | 1.1 km || 
|-id=217 bgcolor=#fefefe
| 177217 ||  || — || October 20, 2003 || Palomar || NEAT || — || align=right data-sort-value="0.99" | 990 m || 
|-id=218 bgcolor=#fefefe
| 177218 ||  || — || October 21, 2003 || Palomar || NEAT || — || align=right data-sort-value="0.96" | 960 m || 
|-id=219 bgcolor=#fefefe
| 177219 ||  || — || October 21, 2003 || Anderson Mesa || LONEOS || V || align=right | 1.1 km || 
|-id=220 bgcolor=#fefefe
| 177220 ||  || — || October 22, 2003 || Socorro || LINEAR || — || align=right | 1.4 km || 
|-id=221 bgcolor=#E9E9E9
| 177221 ||  || — || October 21, 2003 || Kitt Peak || Spacewatch || — || align=right | 1.3 km || 
|-id=222 bgcolor=#fefefe
| 177222 ||  || — || October 22, 2003 || Kitt Peak || Spacewatch || — || align=right | 1.1 km || 
|-id=223 bgcolor=#fefefe
| 177223 ||  || — || October 22, 2003 || Kitt Peak || Spacewatch || — || align=right data-sort-value="0.91" | 910 m || 
|-id=224 bgcolor=#fefefe
| 177224 ||  || — || October 21, 2003 || Socorro || LINEAR || NYS || align=right data-sort-value="0.91" | 910 m || 
|-id=225 bgcolor=#fefefe
| 177225 ||  || — || October 21, 2003 || Socorro || LINEAR || NYS || align=right | 3.5 km || 
|-id=226 bgcolor=#fefefe
| 177226 ||  || — || October 22, 2003 || Socorro || LINEAR || — || align=right | 1.0 km || 
|-id=227 bgcolor=#fefefe
| 177227 ||  || — || October 24, 2003 || Socorro || LINEAR || — || align=right | 1.0 km || 
|-id=228 bgcolor=#fefefe
| 177228 ||  || — || October 24, 2003 || Socorro || LINEAR || V || align=right | 1.0 km || 
|-id=229 bgcolor=#fefefe
| 177229 ||  || — || October 22, 2003 || Haleakala || NEAT || — || align=right | 1.0 km || 
|-id=230 bgcolor=#fefefe
| 177230 ||  || — || October 24, 2003 || Socorro || LINEAR || — || align=right | 1.3 km || 
|-id=231 bgcolor=#E9E9E9
| 177231 ||  || — || October 24, 2003 || Socorro || LINEAR || — || align=right | 1.3 km || 
|-id=232 bgcolor=#fefefe
| 177232 ||  || — || October 25, 2003 || Socorro || LINEAR || — || align=right | 1.3 km || 
|-id=233 bgcolor=#fefefe
| 177233 ||  || — || October 26, 2003 || Catalina || CSS || — || align=right | 1.0 km || 
|-id=234 bgcolor=#fefefe
| 177234 ||  || — || October 26, 2003 || Kitt Peak || Spacewatch || — || align=right | 1.5 km || 
|-id=235 bgcolor=#E9E9E9
| 177235 ||  || — || October 25, 2003 || Socorro || LINEAR || — || align=right | 1.3 km || 
|-id=236 bgcolor=#fefefe
| 177236 ||  || — || October 27, 2003 || Haleakala || NEAT || — || align=right | 1.3 km || 
|-id=237 bgcolor=#fefefe
| 177237 ||  || — || October 28, 2003 || Socorro || LINEAR || NYS || align=right | 1.0 km || 
|-id=238 bgcolor=#fefefe
| 177238 ||  || — || October 28, 2003 || Socorro || LINEAR || — || align=right | 1.4 km || 
|-id=239 bgcolor=#fefefe
| 177239 ||  || — || October 29, 2003 || Socorro || LINEAR || V || align=right data-sort-value="0.98" | 980 m || 
|-id=240 bgcolor=#fefefe
| 177240 ||  || — || October 29, 2003 || Socorro || LINEAR || — || align=right | 1.1 km || 
|-id=241 bgcolor=#E9E9E9
| 177241 ||  || — || October 29, 2003 || Catalina || CSS || — || align=right | 1.4 km || 
|-id=242 bgcolor=#fefefe
| 177242 ||  || — || October 30, 2003 || Socorro || LINEAR || — || align=right | 1.4 km || 
|-id=243 bgcolor=#fefefe
| 177243 ||  || — || October 28, 2003 || Socorro || LINEAR || MAS || align=right data-sort-value="0.78" | 780 m || 
|-id=244 bgcolor=#fefefe
| 177244 ||  || — || November 5, 2003 || Socorro || LINEAR || — || align=right | 1.9 km || 
|-id=245 bgcolor=#E9E9E9
| 177245 || 2003 WB || — || November 17, 2003 || Wrightwood || J. W. Young || EUN || align=right | 2.1 km || 
|-id=246 bgcolor=#fefefe
| 177246 ||  || — || November 18, 2003 || Palomar || NEAT || FLO || align=right | 1.0 km || 
|-id=247 bgcolor=#fefefe
| 177247 ||  || — || November 16, 2003 || Kitt Peak || Spacewatch || FLO || align=right data-sort-value="0.82" | 820 m || 
|-id=248 bgcolor=#fefefe
| 177248 ||  || — || November 18, 2003 || Kitt Peak || Spacewatch || — || align=right | 1.4 km || 
|-id=249 bgcolor=#fefefe
| 177249 ||  || — || November 18, 2003 || Palomar || NEAT || V || align=right data-sort-value="0.93" | 930 m || 
|-id=250 bgcolor=#fefefe
| 177250 ||  || — || November 18, 2003 || Palomar || NEAT || — || align=right | 1.3 km || 
|-id=251 bgcolor=#fefefe
| 177251 ||  || — || November 18, 2003 || Palomar || NEAT || — || align=right | 1.3 km || 
|-id=252 bgcolor=#E9E9E9
| 177252 ||  || — || November 16, 2003 || Kitt Peak || Spacewatch || — || align=right | 1.1 km || 
|-id=253 bgcolor=#fefefe
| 177253 ||  || — || November 19, 2003 || Socorro || LINEAR || — || align=right | 1.4 km || 
|-id=254 bgcolor=#fefefe
| 177254 ||  || — || November 19, 2003 || Socorro || LINEAR || V || align=right | 1.1 km || 
|-id=255 bgcolor=#FFC2E0
| 177255 ||  || — || November 20, 2003 || Socorro || LINEAR || AMO +1km || align=right | 1.7 km || 
|-id=256 bgcolor=#fefefe
| 177256 ||  || — || November 18, 2003 || Kitt Peak || Spacewatch || — || align=right | 1.2 km || 
|-id=257 bgcolor=#fefefe
| 177257 ||  || — || November 18, 2003 || Kitt Peak || Spacewatch || — || align=right | 1.2 km || 
|-id=258 bgcolor=#fefefe
| 177258 ||  || — || November 19, 2003 || Kitt Peak || Spacewatch || ERI || align=right | 2.5 km || 
|-id=259 bgcolor=#fefefe
| 177259 ||  || — || November 20, 2003 || Socorro || LINEAR || NYS || align=right | 2.9 km || 
|-id=260 bgcolor=#fefefe
| 177260 ||  || — || November 20, 2003 || Socorro || LINEAR || — || align=right | 1.4 km || 
|-id=261 bgcolor=#fefefe
| 177261 ||  || — || November 18, 2003 || Palomar || NEAT || — || align=right | 1.4 km || 
|-id=262 bgcolor=#fefefe
| 177262 ||  || — || November 18, 2003 || Kitt Peak || Spacewatch || ERI || align=right | 2.5 km || 
|-id=263 bgcolor=#E9E9E9
| 177263 ||  || — || November 18, 2003 || Palomar || NEAT || — || align=right | 1.3 km || 
|-id=264 bgcolor=#fefefe
| 177264 ||  || — || November 19, 2003 || Kitt Peak || Spacewatch || NYS || align=right | 1.0 km || 
|-id=265 bgcolor=#fefefe
| 177265 ||  || — || November 19, 2003 || Socorro || LINEAR || V || align=right data-sort-value="0.81" | 810 m || 
|-id=266 bgcolor=#FA8072
| 177266 ||  || — || November 24, 2003 || Socorro || LINEAR || — || align=right | 1.4 km || 
|-id=267 bgcolor=#fefefe
| 177267 ||  || — || November 18, 2003 || Palomar || NEAT || V || align=right | 1.0 km || 
|-id=268 bgcolor=#fefefe
| 177268 ||  || — || November 19, 2003 || Anderson Mesa || LONEOS || V || align=right data-sort-value="0.97" | 970 m || 
|-id=269 bgcolor=#fefefe
| 177269 ||  || — || November 21, 2003 || Socorro || LINEAR || — || align=right data-sort-value="0.89" | 890 m || 
|-id=270 bgcolor=#fefefe
| 177270 ||  || — || November 20, 2003 || Socorro || LINEAR || — || align=right | 1.8 km || 
|-id=271 bgcolor=#fefefe
| 177271 ||  || — || November 20, 2003 || Socorro || LINEAR || V || align=right | 1.0 km || 
|-id=272 bgcolor=#fefefe
| 177272 ||  || — || November 20, 2003 || Socorro || LINEAR || FLO || align=right data-sort-value="0.93" | 930 m || 
|-id=273 bgcolor=#fefefe
| 177273 ||  || — || November 20, 2003 || Socorro || LINEAR || — || align=right | 1.2 km || 
|-id=274 bgcolor=#fefefe
| 177274 ||  || — || November 21, 2003 || Socorro || LINEAR || FLO || align=right data-sort-value="0.91" | 910 m || 
|-id=275 bgcolor=#E9E9E9
| 177275 ||  || — || November 19, 2003 || Kitt Peak || Spacewatch || — || align=right | 1.3 km || 
|-id=276 bgcolor=#fefefe
| 177276 ||  || — || November 21, 2003 || Socorro || LINEAR || — || align=right | 2.1 km || 
|-id=277 bgcolor=#E9E9E9
| 177277 ||  || — || November 21, 2003 || Socorro || LINEAR || EUN || align=right | 1.9 km || 
|-id=278 bgcolor=#fefefe
| 177278 ||  || — || November 21, 2003 || Socorro || LINEAR || NYS || align=right | 1.2 km || 
|-id=279 bgcolor=#FA8072
| 177279 ||  || — || November 21, 2003 || Socorro || LINEAR || — || align=right | 1.5 km || 
|-id=280 bgcolor=#fefefe
| 177280 ||  || — || November 23, 2003 || Socorro || LINEAR || — || align=right | 2.7 km || 
|-id=281 bgcolor=#fefefe
| 177281 ||  || — || November 24, 2003 || Socorro || LINEAR || NYS || align=right | 1.8 km || 
|-id=282 bgcolor=#fefefe
| 177282 ||  || — || November 28, 2003 || Sandlot || G. Hug || NYS || align=right | 1.1 km || 
|-id=283 bgcolor=#fefefe
| 177283 ||  || — || November 28, 2003 || Kitt Peak || Spacewatch || FLO || align=right data-sort-value="0.75" | 750 m || 
|-id=284 bgcolor=#fefefe
| 177284 ||  || — || November 26, 2003 || Socorro || LINEAR || PHO || align=right | 2.0 km || 
|-id=285 bgcolor=#fefefe
| 177285 ||  || — || November 26, 2003 || Kitt Peak || Spacewatch || — || align=right | 1.4 km || 
|-id=286 bgcolor=#fefefe
| 177286 ||  || — || November 30, 2003 || Kitt Peak || Spacewatch || — || align=right | 1.5 km || 
|-id=287 bgcolor=#FA8072
| 177287 ||  || — || November 20, 2003 || Socorro || LINEAR || — || align=right | 1.3 km || 
|-id=288 bgcolor=#fefefe
| 177288 || 2003 XF || — || December 3, 2003 || Socorro || LINEAR || — || align=right | 2.0 km || 
|-id=289 bgcolor=#fefefe
| 177289 ||  || — || December 1, 2003 || Kitt Peak || Spacewatch || V || align=right data-sort-value="0.93" | 930 m || 
|-id=290 bgcolor=#fefefe
| 177290 ||  || — || December 1, 2003 || Kitt Peak || Spacewatch || V || align=right data-sort-value="0.97" | 970 m || 
|-id=291 bgcolor=#fefefe
| 177291 ||  || — || December 3, 2003 || Socorro || LINEAR || NYS || align=right | 1.1 km || 
|-id=292 bgcolor=#E9E9E9
| 177292 ||  || — || December 14, 2003 || Socorro || LINEAR || — || align=right | 2.5 km || 
|-id=293 bgcolor=#fefefe
| 177293 ||  || — || December 14, 2003 || Palomar || NEAT || — || align=right | 2.8 km || 
|-id=294 bgcolor=#fefefe
| 177294 ||  || — || December 15, 2003 || Kitt Peak || Spacewatch || — || align=right | 3.5 km || 
|-id=295 bgcolor=#fefefe
| 177295 ||  || — || December 14, 2003 || Kitt Peak || Spacewatch || — || align=right | 1.3 km || 
|-id=296 bgcolor=#fefefe
| 177296 ||  || — || December 15, 2003 || Socorro || LINEAR || — || align=right | 3.8 km || 
|-id=297 bgcolor=#fefefe
| 177297 ||  || — || December 1, 2003 || Kitt Peak || Spacewatch || NYS || align=right data-sort-value="0.81" | 810 m || 
|-id=298 bgcolor=#fefefe
| 177298 ||  || — || December 1, 2003 || Kitt Peak || Spacewatch || — || align=right | 1.2 km || 
|-id=299 bgcolor=#fefefe
| 177299 ||  || — || December 17, 2003 || Socorro || LINEAR || — || align=right | 1.6 km || 
|-id=300 bgcolor=#fefefe
| 177300 ||  || — || December 16, 2003 || Catalina || CSS || — || align=right | 1.3 km || 
|}

177301–177400 

|-bgcolor=#fefefe
| 177301 ||  || — || December 16, 2003 || Catalina || CSS || FLO || align=right data-sort-value="0.80" | 800 m || 
|-id=302 bgcolor=#fefefe
| 177302 ||  || — || December 17, 2003 || Socorro || LINEAR || V || align=right | 1.2 km || 
|-id=303 bgcolor=#fefefe
| 177303 ||  || — || December 17, 2003 || Kitt Peak || Spacewatch || NYS || align=right | 1.1 km || 
|-id=304 bgcolor=#fefefe
| 177304 ||  || — || December 17, 2003 || Anderson Mesa || LONEOS || NYS || align=right | 1.00 km || 
|-id=305 bgcolor=#fefefe
| 177305 ||  || — || December 17, 2003 || Socorro || LINEAR || — || align=right | 1.2 km || 
|-id=306 bgcolor=#fefefe
| 177306 ||  || — || December 17, 2003 || Socorro || LINEAR || — || align=right | 1.3 km || 
|-id=307 bgcolor=#fefefe
| 177307 ||  || — || December 16, 2003 || Anderson Mesa || LONEOS || — || align=right | 1.9 km || 
|-id=308 bgcolor=#E9E9E9
| 177308 ||  || — || December 17, 2003 || Kitt Peak || Spacewatch || — || align=right | 2.4 km || 
|-id=309 bgcolor=#fefefe
| 177309 ||  || — || December 17, 2003 || Kitt Peak || Spacewatch || — || align=right | 1.0 km || 
|-id=310 bgcolor=#fefefe
| 177310 ||  || — || December 18, 2003 || Socorro || LINEAR || V || align=right | 1.0 km || 
|-id=311 bgcolor=#fefefe
| 177311 ||  || — || December 17, 2003 || Kitt Peak || Spacewatch || NYS || align=right | 1.3 km || 
|-id=312 bgcolor=#fefefe
| 177312 ||  || — || December 18, 2003 || Socorro || LINEAR || V || align=right | 1.2 km || 
|-id=313 bgcolor=#fefefe
| 177313 ||  || — || December 16, 2003 || Kitt Peak || Spacewatch || — || align=right | 1.1 km || 
|-id=314 bgcolor=#fefefe
| 177314 ||  || — || December 16, 2003 || Catalina || CSS || — || align=right | 1.4 km || 
|-id=315 bgcolor=#fefefe
| 177315 ||  || — || December 17, 2003 || Catalina || CSS || — || align=right | 1.1 km || 
|-id=316 bgcolor=#fefefe
| 177316 ||  || — || December 18, 2003 || Socorro || LINEAR || V || align=right | 1.1 km || 
|-id=317 bgcolor=#E9E9E9
| 177317 ||  || — || December 19, 2003 || Socorro || LINEAR || — || align=right | 4.2 km || 
|-id=318 bgcolor=#E9E9E9
| 177318 ||  || — || December 17, 2003 || Palomar || NEAT || — || align=right | 2.2 km || 
|-id=319 bgcolor=#fefefe
| 177319 ||  || — || December 19, 2003 || Kitt Peak || Spacewatch || MAS || align=right | 1.1 km || 
|-id=320 bgcolor=#E9E9E9
| 177320 ||  || — || December 19, 2003 || Kitt Peak || Spacewatch || HEN || align=right | 1.1 km || 
|-id=321 bgcolor=#fefefe
| 177321 ||  || — || December 19, 2003 || Socorro || LINEAR || — || align=right | 1.6 km || 
|-id=322 bgcolor=#fefefe
| 177322 ||  || — || December 19, 2003 || Kitt Peak || Spacewatch || — || align=right | 1.6 km || 
|-id=323 bgcolor=#fefefe
| 177323 ||  || — || December 18, 2003 || Socorro || LINEAR || — || align=right | 2.0 km || 
|-id=324 bgcolor=#E9E9E9
| 177324 ||  || — || December 18, 2003 || Socorro || LINEAR || MAR || align=right | 3.1 km || 
|-id=325 bgcolor=#fefefe
| 177325 ||  || — || December 18, 2003 || Socorro || LINEAR || — || align=right | 1.2 km || 
|-id=326 bgcolor=#E9E9E9
| 177326 ||  || — || December 19, 2003 || Socorro || LINEAR || EUN || align=right | 2.2 km || 
|-id=327 bgcolor=#fefefe
| 177327 ||  || — || December 19, 2003 || Socorro || LINEAR || — || align=right | 1.4 km || 
|-id=328 bgcolor=#fefefe
| 177328 ||  || — || December 19, 2003 || Socorro || LINEAR || NYS || align=right data-sort-value="0.90" | 900 m || 
|-id=329 bgcolor=#fefefe
| 177329 ||  || — || December 19, 2003 || Socorro || LINEAR || — || align=right | 1.7 km || 
|-id=330 bgcolor=#E9E9E9
| 177330 ||  || — || December 20, 2003 || Socorro || LINEAR || — || align=right | 4.3 km || 
|-id=331 bgcolor=#E9E9E9
| 177331 ||  || — || December 21, 2003 || Haleakala || NEAT || HNS || align=right | 2.0 km || 
|-id=332 bgcolor=#E9E9E9
| 177332 ||  || — || December 21, 2003 || Catalina || CSS || — || align=right | 2.4 km || 
|-id=333 bgcolor=#fefefe
| 177333 ||  || — || December 18, 2003 || Socorro || LINEAR || MAS || align=right data-sort-value="0.86" | 860 m || 
|-id=334 bgcolor=#fefefe
| 177334 ||  || — || December 18, 2003 || Socorro || LINEAR || — || align=right | 2.7 km || 
|-id=335 bgcolor=#fefefe
| 177335 ||  || — || December 19, 2003 || Socorro || LINEAR || — || align=right | 1.5 km || 
|-id=336 bgcolor=#fefefe
| 177336 ||  || — || December 19, 2003 || Socorro || LINEAR || FLO || align=right | 1.1 km || 
|-id=337 bgcolor=#fefefe
| 177337 ||  || — || December 19, 2003 || Socorro || LINEAR || — || align=right | 1.4 km || 
|-id=338 bgcolor=#fefefe
| 177338 ||  || — || December 22, 2003 || Kitt Peak || Spacewatch || — || align=right | 1.3 km || 
|-id=339 bgcolor=#E9E9E9
| 177339 ||  || — || December 25, 2003 || Haleakala || NEAT || — || align=right | 3.9 km || 
|-id=340 bgcolor=#fefefe
| 177340 ||  || — || December 27, 2003 || Socorro || LINEAR || — || align=right | 1.5 km || 
|-id=341 bgcolor=#E9E9E9
| 177341 ||  || — || December 27, 2003 || Socorro || LINEAR || RAF || align=right | 1.6 km || 
|-id=342 bgcolor=#fefefe
| 177342 ||  || — || December 27, 2003 || Socorro || LINEAR || — || align=right | 3.5 km || 
|-id=343 bgcolor=#fefefe
| 177343 ||  || — || December 27, 2003 || Socorro || LINEAR || V || align=right | 1.1 km || 
|-id=344 bgcolor=#E9E9E9
| 177344 ||  || — || December 27, 2003 || Socorro || LINEAR || — || align=right | 1.8 km || 
|-id=345 bgcolor=#fefefe
| 177345 ||  || — || December 27, 2003 || Socorro || LINEAR || — || align=right | 1.5 km || 
|-id=346 bgcolor=#E9E9E9
| 177346 ||  || — || December 27, 2003 || Socorro || LINEAR || GEF || align=right | 2.4 km || 
|-id=347 bgcolor=#fefefe
| 177347 ||  || — || December 28, 2003 || Socorro || LINEAR || — || align=right | 1.3 km || 
|-id=348 bgcolor=#fefefe
| 177348 ||  || — || December 27, 2003 || Socorro || LINEAR || — || align=right | 1.4 km || 
|-id=349 bgcolor=#fefefe
| 177349 ||  || — || December 27, 2003 || Socorro || LINEAR || — || align=right | 1.3 km || 
|-id=350 bgcolor=#E9E9E9
| 177350 ||  || — || December 28, 2003 || Socorro || LINEAR || — || align=right | 4.4 km || 
|-id=351 bgcolor=#fefefe
| 177351 ||  || — || December 29, 2003 || Socorro || LINEAR || — || align=right | 1.3 km || 
|-id=352 bgcolor=#fefefe
| 177352 ||  || — || December 16, 2003 || Kitt Peak || Spacewatch || V || align=right | 1.1 km || 
|-id=353 bgcolor=#fefefe
| 177353 ||  || — || December 17, 2003 || Socorro || LINEAR || — || align=right | 1.4 km || 
|-id=354 bgcolor=#fefefe
| 177354 ||  || — || December 18, 2003 || Kitt Peak || Spacewatch || — || align=right | 1.4 km || 
|-id=355 bgcolor=#fefefe
| 177355 ||  || — || January 12, 2004 || Palomar || NEAT || — || align=right | 1.4 km || 
|-id=356 bgcolor=#fefefe
| 177356 ||  || — || January 13, 2004 || Anderson Mesa || LONEOS || V || align=right | 1.3 km || 
|-id=357 bgcolor=#fefefe
| 177357 ||  || — || January 13, 2004 || Anderson Mesa || LONEOS || — || align=right | 1.6 km || 
|-id=358 bgcolor=#fefefe
| 177358 ||  || — || January 15, 2004 || Kitt Peak || Spacewatch || — || align=right | 1.0 km || 
|-id=359 bgcolor=#fefefe
| 177359 ||  || — || January 16, 2004 || Palomar || NEAT || MAS || align=right | 1.1 km || 
|-id=360 bgcolor=#fefefe
| 177360 ||  || — || January 16, 2004 || Palomar || NEAT || NYS || align=right | 1.3 km || 
|-id=361 bgcolor=#fefefe
| 177361 ||  || — || January 16, 2004 || Kitt Peak || Spacewatch || NYS || align=right | 1.0 km || 
|-id=362 bgcolor=#fefefe
| 177362 ||  || — || January 16, 2004 || Kitt Peak || Spacewatch || MAS || align=right | 1.1 km || 
|-id=363 bgcolor=#fefefe
| 177363 ||  || — || January 16, 2004 || Palomar || NEAT || — || align=right | 1.4 km || 
|-id=364 bgcolor=#fefefe
| 177364 ||  || — || January 16, 2004 || Kitt Peak || Spacewatch || — || align=right | 1.3 km || 
|-id=365 bgcolor=#fefefe
| 177365 ||  || — || January 16, 2004 || Kitt Peak || Spacewatch || — || align=right | 1.9 km || 
|-id=366 bgcolor=#fefefe
| 177366 ||  || — || January 17, 2004 || Palomar || NEAT || — || align=right | 1.3 km || 
|-id=367 bgcolor=#E9E9E9
| 177367 ||  || — || January 18, 2004 || Palomar || NEAT || — || align=right | 1.8 km || 
|-id=368 bgcolor=#E9E9E9
| 177368 ||  || — || January 19, 2004 || Anderson Mesa || LONEOS || — || align=right | 1.8 km || 
|-id=369 bgcolor=#E9E9E9
| 177369 ||  || — || January 18, 2004 || Palomar || NEAT || — || align=right | 2.0 km || 
|-id=370 bgcolor=#fefefe
| 177370 ||  || — || January 19, 2004 || Anderson Mesa || LONEOS || — || align=right | 2.3 km || 
|-id=371 bgcolor=#E9E9E9
| 177371 ||  || — || January 19, 2004 || Kitt Peak || Spacewatch || — || align=right | 2.7 km || 
|-id=372 bgcolor=#fefefe
| 177372 ||  || — || January 19, 2004 || Kitt Peak || Spacewatch || — || align=right | 1.3 km || 
|-id=373 bgcolor=#fefefe
| 177373 ||  || — || January 19, 2004 || Kitt Peak || Spacewatch || NYS || align=right | 1.1 km || 
|-id=374 bgcolor=#E9E9E9
| 177374 ||  || — || January 21, 2004 || Socorro || LINEAR || JUN || align=right | 1.3 km || 
|-id=375 bgcolor=#fefefe
| 177375 ||  || — || January 21, 2004 || Socorro || LINEAR || — || align=right | 2.9 km || 
|-id=376 bgcolor=#fefefe
| 177376 ||  || — || January 22, 2004 || Socorro || LINEAR || NYS || align=right | 1.2 km || 
|-id=377 bgcolor=#E9E9E9
| 177377 ||  || — || January 23, 2004 || Socorro || LINEAR || — || align=right | 1.8 km || 
|-id=378 bgcolor=#E9E9E9
| 177378 ||  || — || January 23, 2004 || Anderson Mesa || LONEOS || — || align=right | 2.0 km || 
|-id=379 bgcolor=#fefefe
| 177379 ||  || — || January 23, 2004 || Socorro || LINEAR || — || align=right | 1.5 km || 
|-id=380 bgcolor=#fefefe
| 177380 ||  || — || January 21, 2004 || Socorro || LINEAR || MAS || align=right | 1.3 km || 
|-id=381 bgcolor=#E9E9E9
| 177381 ||  || — || January 21, 2004 || Socorro || LINEAR || — || align=right | 1.9 km || 
|-id=382 bgcolor=#fefefe
| 177382 ||  || — || January 22, 2004 || Socorro || LINEAR || NYS || align=right | 1.1 km || 
|-id=383 bgcolor=#fefefe
| 177383 ||  || — || January 22, 2004 || Socorro || LINEAR || — || align=right | 1.1 km || 
|-id=384 bgcolor=#fefefe
| 177384 ||  || — || January 22, 2004 || Socorro || LINEAR || V || align=right | 1.1 km || 
|-id=385 bgcolor=#fefefe
| 177385 ||  || — || January 23, 2004 || Socorro || LINEAR || — || align=right | 1.6 km || 
|-id=386 bgcolor=#E9E9E9
| 177386 ||  || — || January 24, 2004 || Socorro || LINEAR || ADE || align=right | 4.1 km || 
|-id=387 bgcolor=#fefefe
| 177387 ||  || — || January 24, 2004 || Socorro || LINEAR || EUT || align=right | 1.1 km || 
|-id=388 bgcolor=#fefefe
| 177388 ||  || — || January 24, 2004 || Socorro || LINEAR || — || align=right | 1.3 km || 
|-id=389 bgcolor=#E9E9E9
| 177389 ||  || — || January 23, 2004 || Socorro || LINEAR || — || align=right | 2.3 km || 
|-id=390 bgcolor=#E9E9E9
| 177390 ||  || — || January 28, 2004 || Kitt Peak || Spacewatch || EUN || align=right | 2.1 km || 
|-id=391 bgcolor=#E9E9E9
| 177391 ||  || — || January 23, 2004 || Socorro || LINEAR || — || align=right | 2.9 km || 
|-id=392 bgcolor=#fefefe
| 177392 ||  || — || January 24, 2004 || Socorro || LINEAR || NYS || align=right | 1.0 km || 
|-id=393 bgcolor=#fefefe
| 177393 ||  || — || January 23, 2004 || Socorro || LINEAR || V || align=right | 1.0 km || 
|-id=394 bgcolor=#E9E9E9
| 177394 ||  || — || January 23, 2004 || Socorro || LINEAR || ADE || align=right | 3.1 km || 
|-id=395 bgcolor=#E9E9E9
| 177395 ||  || — || January 28, 2004 || Socorro || LINEAR || — || align=right | 3.0 km || 
|-id=396 bgcolor=#E9E9E9
| 177396 ||  || — || January 28, 2004 || Socorro || LINEAR || — || align=right | 3.5 km || 
|-id=397 bgcolor=#fefefe
| 177397 ||  || — || January 28, 2004 || Haleakala || NEAT || — || align=right | 1.7 km || 
|-id=398 bgcolor=#E9E9E9
| 177398 ||  || — || January 23, 2004 || Socorro || LINEAR || — || align=right | 1.9 km || 
|-id=399 bgcolor=#E9E9E9
| 177399 ||  || — || January 23, 2004 || Socorro || LINEAR || — || align=right | 4.1 km || 
|-id=400 bgcolor=#fefefe
| 177400 ||  || — || January 28, 2004 || Kitt Peak || Spacewatch || — || align=right | 1.5 km || 
|}

177401–177500 

|-bgcolor=#fefefe
| 177401 ||  || — || January 28, 2004 || Catalina || CSS || — || align=right | 1.5 km || 
|-id=402 bgcolor=#E9E9E9
| 177402 ||  || — || January 28, 2004 || Catalina || CSS || BRU || align=right | 3.4 km || 
|-id=403 bgcolor=#E9E9E9
| 177403 ||  || — || January 28, 2004 || Catalina || CSS || HNS || align=right | 3.4 km || 
|-id=404 bgcolor=#fefefe
| 177404 ||  || — || January 28, 2004 || Catalina || CSS || — || align=right | 1.9 km || 
|-id=405 bgcolor=#fefefe
| 177405 ||  || — || January 30, 2004 || Socorro || LINEAR || — || align=right | 1.8 km || 
|-id=406 bgcolor=#fefefe
| 177406 ||  || — || January 21, 2004 || Socorro || LINEAR || V || align=right | 1.1 km || 
|-id=407 bgcolor=#fefefe
| 177407 ||  || — || January 22, 2004 || Socorro || LINEAR || MAS || align=right | 1.1 km || 
|-id=408 bgcolor=#fefefe
| 177408 ||  || — || January 22, 2004 || Socorro || LINEAR || — || align=right | 1.5 km || 
|-id=409 bgcolor=#fefefe
| 177409 ||  || — || January 16, 2004 || Kitt Peak || Spacewatch || NYS || align=right | 1.2 km || 
|-id=410 bgcolor=#fefefe
| 177410 ||  || — || January 26, 2004 || Anderson Mesa || LONEOS || — || align=right | 1.5 km || 
|-id=411 bgcolor=#E9E9E9
| 177411 ||  || — || January 16, 2004 || Palomar || NEAT || — || align=right | 1.5 km || 
|-id=412 bgcolor=#E9E9E9
| 177412 || 2004 CK || — || February 2, 2004 || Socorro || LINEAR || JUN || align=right | 1.4 km || 
|-id=413 bgcolor=#E9E9E9
| 177413 ||  || — || February 12, 2004 || Desert Eagle || W. K. Y. Yeung || EUN || align=right | 1.6 km || 
|-id=414 bgcolor=#E9E9E9
| 177414 ||  || — || February 11, 2004 || Palomar || NEAT || HNS || align=right | 1.9 km || 
|-id=415 bgcolor=#E9E9E9
| 177415 Queloz ||  ||  || February 9, 2004 || Vicques || M. Ory || — || align=right | 2.4 km || 
|-id=416 bgcolor=#fefefe
| 177416 ||  || — || February 10, 2004 || Nogales || Tenagra II Obs. || MAS || align=right | 1.0 km || 
|-id=417 bgcolor=#E9E9E9
| 177417 ||  || — || February 10, 2004 || Palomar || NEAT || — || align=right | 3.1 km || 
|-id=418 bgcolor=#fefefe
| 177418 ||  || — || February 11, 2004 || Palomar || NEAT || NYS || align=right | 1.0 km || 
|-id=419 bgcolor=#fefefe
| 177419 ||  || — || February 11, 2004 || Catalina || CSS || MAS || align=right | 1.5 km || 
|-id=420 bgcolor=#E9E9E9
| 177420 ||  || — || February 11, 2004 || Palomar || NEAT || — || align=right | 1.8 km || 
|-id=421 bgcolor=#E9E9E9
| 177421 ||  || — || February 11, 2004 || Palomar || NEAT || MAR || align=right | 2.1 km || 
|-id=422 bgcolor=#E9E9E9
| 177422 ||  || — || February 10, 2004 || Palomar || NEAT || — || align=right | 2.7 km || 
|-id=423 bgcolor=#fefefe
| 177423 ||  || — || February 11, 2004 || Palomar || NEAT || NYS || align=right | 1.6 km || 
|-id=424 bgcolor=#fefefe
| 177424 ||  || — || February 12, 2004 || Kitt Peak || Spacewatch || MAS || align=right | 1.2 km || 
|-id=425 bgcolor=#E9E9E9
| 177425 ||  || — || February 12, 2004 || Palomar || NEAT || — || align=right | 1.7 km || 
|-id=426 bgcolor=#fefefe
| 177426 ||  || — || February 11, 2004 || Palomar || NEAT || — || align=right | 2.0 km || 
|-id=427 bgcolor=#E9E9E9
| 177427 ||  || — || February 11, 2004 || Anderson Mesa || LONEOS || GEF || align=right | 2.1 km || 
|-id=428 bgcolor=#E9E9E9
| 177428 ||  || — || February 11, 2004 || Palomar || NEAT || — || align=right | 1.5 km || 
|-id=429 bgcolor=#fefefe
| 177429 ||  || — || February 12, 2004 || Palomar || NEAT || — || align=right | 3.5 km || 
|-id=430 bgcolor=#E9E9E9
| 177430 ||  || — || February 13, 2004 || Kitt Peak || Spacewatch || — || align=right | 2.5 km || 
|-id=431 bgcolor=#fefefe
| 177431 ||  || — || February 11, 2004 || Anderson Mesa || LONEOS || — || align=right | 1.1 km || 
|-id=432 bgcolor=#E9E9E9
| 177432 ||  || — || February 13, 2004 || Palomar || NEAT || — || align=right | 1.8 km || 
|-id=433 bgcolor=#E9E9E9
| 177433 ||  || — || February 13, 2004 || Kitt Peak || Spacewatch || — || align=right | 1.9 km || 
|-id=434 bgcolor=#E9E9E9
| 177434 ||  || — || February 11, 2004 || Palomar || NEAT || — || align=right | 2.4 km || 
|-id=435 bgcolor=#fefefe
| 177435 ||  || — || February 11, 2004 || Kitt Peak || Spacewatch || NYS || align=right | 1.3 km || 
|-id=436 bgcolor=#fefefe
| 177436 ||  || — || February 11, 2004 || Palomar || NEAT || MAS || align=right | 1.1 km || 
|-id=437 bgcolor=#E9E9E9
| 177437 ||  || — || February 14, 2004 || Haleakala || NEAT || HNS || align=right | 1.9 km || 
|-id=438 bgcolor=#fefefe
| 177438 ||  || — || February 11, 2004 || Palomar || NEAT || MAS || align=right | 1.4 km || 
|-id=439 bgcolor=#E9E9E9
| 177439 ||  || — || February 13, 2004 || Palomar || NEAT || — || align=right | 2.6 km || 
|-id=440 bgcolor=#E9E9E9
| 177440 ||  || — || February 13, 2004 || Palomar || NEAT || ADE || align=right | 3.4 km || 
|-id=441 bgcolor=#E9E9E9
| 177441 ||  || — || February 14, 2004 || Kitt Peak || Spacewatch || — || align=right | 2.0 km || 
|-id=442 bgcolor=#fefefe
| 177442 ||  || — || February 14, 2004 || Catalina || CSS || — || align=right | 1.4 km || 
|-id=443 bgcolor=#E9E9E9
| 177443 ||  || — || February 13, 2004 || Palomar || NEAT || — || align=right | 2.7 km || 
|-id=444 bgcolor=#E9E9E9
| 177444 ||  || — || February 13, 2004 || Palomar || NEAT || — || align=right | 5.7 km || 
|-id=445 bgcolor=#E9E9E9
| 177445 ||  || — || February 14, 2004 || Palomar || NEAT || MAR || align=right | 1.8 km || 
|-id=446 bgcolor=#fefefe
| 177446 ||  || — || February 14, 2004 || Kitt Peak || Spacewatch || — || align=right | 1.4 km || 
|-id=447 bgcolor=#fefefe
| 177447 ||  || — || February 11, 2004 || Kitt Peak || Spacewatch || — || align=right | 1.2 km || 
|-id=448 bgcolor=#E9E9E9
| 177448 ||  || — || February 17, 2004 || Kitt Peak || Spacewatch || — || align=right | 2.0 km || 
|-id=449 bgcolor=#E9E9E9
| 177449 ||  || — || February 16, 2004 || Kitt Peak || Spacewatch || — || align=right | 4.5 km || 
|-id=450 bgcolor=#fefefe
| 177450 ||  || — || February 16, 2004 || Kitt Peak || Spacewatch || — || align=right | 1.5 km || 
|-id=451 bgcolor=#E9E9E9
| 177451 ||  || — || February 16, 2004 || Catalina || CSS || — || align=right | 1.6 km || 
|-id=452 bgcolor=#E9E9E9
| 177452 ||  || — || February 17, 2004 || Kitt Peak || Spacewatch || — || align=right | 4.6 km || 
|-id=453 bgcolor=#E9E9E9
| 177453 ||  || — || February 18, 2004 || Kitt Peak || Spacewatch || — || align=right | 2.2 km || 
|-id=454 bgcolor=#fefefe
| 177454 ||  || — || February 16, 2004 || Catalina || CSS || V || align=right | 1.2 km || 
|-id=455 bgcolor=#E9E9E9
| 177455 ||  || — || February 17, 2004 || Socorro || LINEAR || — || align=right | 2.5 km || 
|-id=456 bgcolor=#E9E9E9
| 177456 ||  || — || February 17, 2004 || Catalina || CSS || — || align=right | 4.9 km || 
|-id=457 bgcolor=#E9E9E9
| 177457 ||  || — || February 19, 2004 || Socorro || LINEAR || — || align=right | 1.1 km || 
|-id=458 bgcolor=#E9E9E9
| 177458 ||  || — || February 19, 2004 || Socorro || LINEAR || EUN || align=right | 1.6 km || 
|-id=459 bgcolor=#E9E9E9
| 177459 ||  || — || February 19, 2004 || Socorro || LINEAR || — || align=right | 1.5 km || 
|-id=460 bgcolor=#E9E9E9
| 177460 ||  || — || February 18, 2004 || Haleakala || NEAT || — || align=right | 2.4 km || 
|-id=461 bgcolor=#E9E9E9
| 177461 ||  || — || February 19, 2004 || Socorro || LINEAR || — || align=right | 1.4 km || 
|-id=462 bgcolor=#E9E9E9
| 177462 ||  || — || February 19, 2004 || Socorro || LINEAR || — || align=right | 3.4 km || 
|-id=463 bgcolor=#E9E9E9
| 177463 ||  || — || February 23, 2004 || Socorro || LINEAR || — || align=right | 1.6 km || 
|-id=464 bgcolor=#fefefe
| 177464 ||  || — || February 19, 2004 || Socorro || LINEAR || NYS || align=right | 1.0 km || 
|-id=465 bgcolor=#fefefe
| 177465 ||  || — || February 23, 2004 || Socorro || LINEAR || — || align=right | 1.5 km || 
|-id=466 bgcolor=#E9E9E9
| 177466 ||  || — || February 23, 2004 || Socorro || LINEAR || MIS || align=right | 3.2 km || 
|-id=467 bgcolor=#E9E9E9
| 177467 ||  || — || February 23, 2004 || Socorro || LINEAR || MAR || align=right | 2.2 km || 
|-id=468 bgcolor=#E9E9E9
| 177468 ||  || — || February 26, 2004 || Socorro || LINEAR || — || align=right | 1.7 km || 
|-id=469 bgcolor=#E9E9E9
| 177469 ||  || — || February 26, 2004 || Socorro || LINEAR || — || align=right | 2.3 km || 
|-id=470 bgcolor=#E9E9E9
| 177470 ||  || — || February 17, 2004 || Socorro || LINEAR || MAR || align=right | 1.6 km || 
|-id=471 bgcolor=#fefefe
| 177471 ||  || — || February 17, 2004 || Palomar || NEAT || V || align=right | 1.3 km || 
|-id=472 bgcolor=#fefefe
| 177472 ||  || — || February 17, 2004 || Socorro || LINEAR || NYS || align=right | 1.1 km || 
|-id=473 bgcolor=#E9E9E9
| 177473 ||  || — || February 17, 2004 || Kitt Peak || Spacewatch || HEN || align=right | 1.5 km || 
|-id=474 bgcolor=#E9E9E9
| 177474 ||  || — || March 11, 2004 || Palomar || NEAT || ADE || align=right | 4.1 km || 
|-id=475 bgcolor=#E9E9E9
| 177475 ||  || — || March 11, 2004 || Palomar || NEAT || — || align=right | 1.3 km || 
|-id=476 bgcolor=#E9E9E9
| 177476 ||  || — || March 13, 2004 || Palomar || NEAT || MIS || align=right | 3.2 km || 
|-id=477 bgcolor=#E9E9E9
| 177477 ||  || — || March 12, 2004 || Palomar || NEAT || — || align=right | 3.7 km || 
|-id=478 bgcolor=#E9E9E9
| 177478 ||  || — || March 15, 2004 || Desert Eagle || W. K. Y. Yeung || — || align=right | 1.6 km || 
|-id=479 bgcolor=#E9E9E9
| 177479 ||  || — || March 11, 2004 || Palomar || NEAT || — || align=right | 2.3 km || 
|-id=480 bgcolor=#E9E9E9
| 177480 ||  || — || March 11, 2004 || Palomar || NEAT || — || align=right | 2.1 km || 
|-id=481 bgcolor=#E9E9E9
| 177481 ||  || — || March 12, 2004 || Palomar || NEAT || — || align=right | 2.2 km || 
|-id=482 bgcolor=#E9E9E9
| 177482 ||  || — || March 12, 2004 || Palomar || NEAT || INO || align=right | 2.0 km || 
|-id=483 bgcolor=#E9E9E9
| 177483 ||  || — || March 12, 2004 || Palomar || NEAT || — || align=right | 3.3 km || 
|-id=484 bgcolor=#E9E9E9
| 177484 ||  || — || March 14, 2004 || Kitt Peak || Spacewatch || — || align=right | 1.8 km || 
|-id=485 bgcolor=#E9E9E9
| 177485 ||  || — || March 14, 2004 || Kitt Peak || Spacewatch || — || align=right | 3.7 km || 
|-id=486 bgcolor=#E9E9E9
| 177486 ||  || — || March 15, 2004 || Kitt Peak || Spacewatch || — || align=right | 3.3 km || 
|-id=487 bgcolor=#E9E9E9
| 177487 ||  || — || March 14, 2004 || Palomar || NEAT || — || align=right | 2.2 km || 
|-id=488 bgcolor=#E9E9E9
| 177488 ||  || — || March 15, 2004 || Kitt Peak || Spacewatch || — || align=right | 2.3 km || 
|-id=489 bgcolor=#E9E9E9
| 177489 ||  || — || March 15, 2004 || Palomar || NEAT || — || align=right | 3.4 km || 
|-id=490 bgcolor=#E9E9E9
| 177490 ||  || — || March 12, 2004 || Palomar || NEAT || — || align=right | 1.2 km || 
|-id=491 bgcolor=#E9E9E9
| 177491 ||  || — || March 13, 2004 || Palomar || NEAT || — || align=right | 5.1 km || 
|-id=492 bgcolor=#E9E9E9
| 177492 ||  || — || March 14, 2004 || Palomar || NEAT || — || align=right | 2.7 km || 
|-id=493 bgcolor=#d6d6d6
| 177493 ||  || — || March 15, 2004 || Socorro || LINEAR || — || align=right | 5.3 km || 
|-id=494 bgcolor=#E9E9E9
| 177494 ||  || — || March 15, 2004 || Catalina || CSS || — || align=right | 3.7 km || 
|-id=495 bgcolor=#E9E9E9
| 177495 ||  || — || March 15, 2004 || Socorro || LINEAR || — || align=right | 1.4 km || 
|-id=496 bgcolor=#E9E9E9
| 177496 ||  || — || March 15, 2004 || Catalina || CSS || — || align=right | 2.4 km || 
|-id=497 bgcolor=#E9E9E9
| 177497 ||  || — || March 15, 2004 || Catalina || CSS || — || align=right | 2.0 km || 
|-id=498 bgcolor=#E9E9E9
| 177498 ||  || — || March 15, 2004 || Catalina || CSS || — || align=right | 2.0 km || 
|-id=499 bgcolor=#E9E9E9
| 177499 ||  || — || March 12, 2004 || Palomar || NEAT || — || align=right data-sort-value="0.99" | 990 m || 
|-id=500 bgcolor=#E9E9E9
| 177500 ||  || — || March 15, 2004 || Catalina || CSS || WAT || align=right | 3.8 km || 
|}

177501–177600 

|-bgcolor=#E9E9E9
| 177501 ||  || — || March 15, 2004 || Socorro || LINEAR || — || align=right | 2.9 km || 
|-id=502 bgcolor=#E9E9E9
| 177502 ||  || — || March 15, 2004 || Socorro || LINEAR || — || align=right | 2.6 km || 
|-id=503 bgcolor=#E9E9E9
| 177503 ||  || — || March 15, 2004 || Socorro || LINEAR || GEF || align=right | 2.2 km || 
|-id=504 bgcolor=#E9E9E9
| 177504 ||  || — || March 14, 2004 || Palomar || NEAT || — || align=right | 2.1 km || 
|-id=505 bgcolor=#E9E9E9
| 177505 ||  || — || March 14, 2004 || Palomar || NEAT || RAF || align=right | 1.6 km || 
|-id=506 bgcolor=#E9E9E9
| 177506 ||  || — || March 15, 2004 || Catalina || CSS || — || align=right | 1.8 km || 
|-id=507 bgcolor=#E9E9E9
| 177507 ||  || — || March 15, 2004 || Socorro || LINEAR || EUN || align=right | 1.4 km || 
|-id=508 bgcolor=#E9E9E9
| 177508 ||  || — || March 15, 2004 || Palomar || NEAT || — || align=right | 4.1 km || 
|-id=509 bgcolor=#E9E9E9
| 177509 ||  || — || March 15, 2004 || Palomar || NEAT || — || align=right | 2.8 km || 
|-id=510 bgcolor=#E9E9E9
| 177510 ||  || — || March 14, 2004 || Socorro || LINEAR || INO || align=right | 1.9 km || 
|-id=511 bgcolor=#E9E9E9
| 177511 ||  || — || March 14, 2004 || Socorro || LINEAR || KRM || align=right | 4.5 km || 
|-id=512 bgcolor=#E9E9E9
| 177512 ||  || — || March 14, 2004 || Socorro || LINEAR || — || align=right | 3.8 km || 
|-id=513 bgcolor=#E9E9E9
| 177513 ||  || — || March 14, 2004 || Socorro || LINEAR || EUN || align=right | 1.9 km || 
|-id=514 bgcolor=#E9E9E9
| 177514 ||  || — || March 15, 2004 || Kitt Peak || Spacewatch || — || align=right | 1.9 km || 
|-id=515 bgcolor=#E9E9E9
| 177515 ||  || — || March 15, 2004 || Kitt Peak || Spacewatch || — || align=right | 3.2 km || 
|-id=516 bgcolor=#E9E9E9
| 177516 ||  || — || March 15, 2004 || Catalina || CSS || — || align=right | 1.1 km || 
|-id=517 bgcolor=#E9E9E9
| 177517 ||  || — || March 12, 2004 || Palomar || NEAT || — || align=right | 1.8 km || 
|-id=518 bgcolor=#E9E9E9
| 177518 ||  || — || March 15, 2004 || Socorro || LINEAR || — || align=right | 3.9 km || 
|-id=519 bgcolor=#E9E9E9
| 177519 ||  || — || March 12, 2004 || Palomar || NEAT || GER || align=right | 2.3 km || 
|-id=520 bgcolor=#E9E9E9
| 177520 ||  || — || March 15, 2004 || Socorro || LINEAR || — || align=right | 2.6 km || 
|-id=521 bgcolor=#d6d6d6
| 177521 ||  || — || March 14, 2004 || Kitt Peak || Spacewatch || CHA || align=right | 3.2 km || 
|-id=522 bgcolor=#E9E9E9
| 177522 ||  || — || March 15, 2004 || Kitt Peak || Spacewatch || AER || align=right | 1.9 km || 
|-id=523 bgcolor=#E9E9E9
| 177523 ||  || — || March 15, 2004 || Catalina || CSS || — || align=right | 3.9 km || 
|-id=524 bgcolor=#E9E9E9
| 177524 ||  || — || March 15, 2004 || Kitt Peak || Spacewatch || — || align=right | 2.2 km || 
|-id=525 bgcolor=#E9E9E9
| 177525 ||  || — || March 16, 2004 || Catalina || CSS || — || align=right | 4.9 km || 
|-id=526 bgcolor=#E9E9E9
| 177526 ||  || — || March 23, 2004 || Goodricke-Pigott || R. A. Tucker || — || align=right | 3.9 km || 
|-id=527 bgcolor=#E9E9E9
| 177527 ||  || — || March 16, 2004 || Catalina || CSS || — || align=right | 3.0 km || 
|-id=528 bgcolor=#E9E9E9
| 177528 ||  || — || March 16, 2004 || Socorro || LINEAR || TIN || align=right | 4.5 km || 
|-id=529 bgcolor=#fefefe
| 177529 ||  || — || March 16, 2004 || Socorro || LINEAR || — || align=right | 2.3 km || 
|-id=530 bgcolor=#E9E9E9
| 177530 ||  || — || March 16, 2004 || Kitt Peak || Spacewatch || AGN || align=right | 1.6 km || 
|-id=531 bgcolor=#E9E9E9
| 177531 ||  || — || March 16, 2004 || Kitt Peak || Spacewatch || — || align=right | 1.4 km || 
|-id=532 bgcolor=#E9E9E9
| 177532 ||  || — || March 17, 2004 || Kitt Peak || Spacewatch || — || align=right | 3.0 km || 
|-id=533 bgcolor=#E9E9E9
| 177533 ||  || — || March 17, 2004 || Socorro || LINEAR || MAR || align=right | 1.8 km || 
|-id=534 bgcolor=#E9E9E9
| 177534 ||  || — || March 17, 2004 || Kitt Peak || Spacewatch || WIT || align=right | 1.5 km || 
|-id=535 bgcolor=#E9E9E9
| 177535 ||  || — || March 27, 2004 || Bergisch Gladbach || W. Bickel || — || align=right | 4.6 km || 
|-id=536 bgcolor=#E9E9E9
| 177536 ||  || — || March 16, 2004 || Socorro || LINEAR || RAF || align=right | 1.6 km || 
|-id=537 bgcolor=#E9E9E9
| 177537 ||  || — || March 17, 2004 || Kitt Peak || Spacewatch || — || align=right | 4.4 km || 
|-id=538 bgcolor=#E9E9E9
| 177538 ||  || — || March 18, 2004 || Socorro || LINEAR || MAR || align=right | 2.0 km || 
|-id=539 bgcolor=#E9E9E9
| 177539 ||  || — || March 18, 2004 || Socorro || LINEAR || — || align=right | 3.3 km || 
|-id=540 bgcolor=#E9E9E9
| 177540 ||  || — || March 20, 2004 || Socorro || LINEAR || NEM || align=right | 5.3 km || 
|-id=541 bgcolor=#E9E9E9
| 177541 ||  || — || March 20, 2004 || Socorro || LINEAR || — || align=right | 3.1 km || 
|-id=542 bgcolor=#E9E9E9
| 177542 ||  || — || March 18, 2004 || Kitt Peak || Spacewatch || — || align=right | 2.7 km || 
|-id=543 bgcolor=#E9E9E9
| 177543 ||  || — || March 19, 2004 || Socorro || LINEAR || — || align=right | 3.7 km || 
|-id=544 bgcolor=#E9E9E9
| 177544 ||  || — || March 19, 2004 || Socorro || LINEAR || — || align=right | 1.4 km || 
|-id=545 bgcolor=#E9E9E9
| 177545 ||  || — || March 19, 2004 || Socorro || LINEAR || GEF || align=right | 2.3 km || 
|-id=546 bgcolor=#E9E9E9
| 177546 ||  || — || March 19, 2004 || Socorro || LINEAR || — || align=right | 2.5 km || 
|-id=547 bgcolor=#E9E9E9
| 177547 ||  || — || March 20, 2004 || Socorro || LINEAR || — || align=right | 4.0 km || 
|-id=548 bgcolor=#E9E9E9
| 177548 ||  || — || March 20, 2004 || Socorro || LINEAR || — || align=right | 2.3 km || 
|-id=549 bgcolor=#E9E9E9
| 177549 ||  || — || March 20, 2004 || Socorro || LINEAR || — || align=right | 2.8 km || 
|-id=550 bgcolor=#E9E9E9
| 177550 ||  || — || March 16, 2004 || Kitt Peak || Spacewatch || — || align=right | 2.2 km || 
|-id=551 bgcolor=#E9E9E9
| 177551 ||  || — || March 16, 2004 || Socorro || LINEAR || — || align=right | 3.7 km || 
|-id=552 bgcolor=#E9E9E9
| 177552 ||  || — || March 18, 2004 || Palomar || NEAT || — || align=right | 3.8 km || 
|-id=553 bgcolor=#E9E9E9
| 177553 ||  || — || March 18, 2004 || Socorro || LINEAR || — || align=right | 1.9 km || 
|-id=554 bgcolor=#E9E9E9
| 177554 ||  || — || March 19, 2004 || Palomar || NEAT || MAR || align=right | 1.6 km || 
|-id=555 bgcolor=#E9E9E9
| 177555 ||  || — || March 21, 2004 || Kitt Peak || Spacewatch || — || align=right | 3.9 km || 
|-id=556 bgcolor=#E9E9E9
| 177556 ||  || — || March 22, 2004 || Socorro || LINEAR || — || align=right | 3.3 km || 
|-id=557 bgcolor=#E9E9E9
| 177557 ||  || — || March 23, 2004 || Socorro || LINEAR || — || align=right | 2.3 km || 
|-id=558 bgcolor=#E9E9E9
| 177558 ||  || — || March 19, 2004 || Socorro || LINEAR || — || align=right | 3.5 km || 
|-id=559 bgcolor=#E9E9E9
| 177559 ||  || — || March 19, 2004 || Socorro || LINEAR || NEM || align=right | 3.6 km || 
|-id=560 bgcolor=#E9E9E9
| 177560 ||  || — || March 19, 2004 || Socorro || LINEAR || — || align=right | 2.9 km || 
|-id=561 bgcolor=#E9E9E9
| 177561 ||  || — || March 24, 2004 || Siding Spring || SSS || HNS || align=right | 2.1 km || 
|-id=562 bgcolor=#E9E9E9
| 177562 ||  || — || March 25, 2004 || Socorro || LINEAR || — || align=right | 2.7 km || 
|-id=563 bgcolor=#E9E9E9
| 177563 ||  || — || March 20, 2004 || Socorro || LINEAR || — || align=right | 3.5 km || 
|-id=564 bgcolor=#E9E9E9
| 177564 ||  || — || March 24, 2004 || Anderson Mesa || LONEOS || NEM || align=right | 4.0 km || 
|-id=565 bgcolor=#E9E9E9
| 177565 ||  || — || March 23, 2004 || Socorro || LINEAR || — || align=right | 3.8 km || 
|-id=566 bgcolor=#E9E9E9
| 177566 ||  || — || March 23, 2004 || Socorro || LINEAR || — || align=right | 1.7 km || 
|-id=567 bgcolor=#E9E9E9
| 177567 ||  || — || March 23, 2004 || Kitt Peak || Spacewatch || — || align=right | 1.8 km || 
|-id=568 bgcolor=#d6d6d6
| 177568 ||  || — || March 23, 2004 || Kitt Peak || Spacewatch || — || align=right | 3.7 km || 
|-id=569 bgcolor=#E9E9E9
| 177569 ||  || — || March 23, 2004 || Socorro || LINEAR || — || align=right | 2.6 km || 
|-id=570 bgcolor=#E9E9E9
| 177570 ||  || — || March 23, 2004 || Socorro || LINEAR || — || align=right | 2.7 km || 
|-id=571 bgcolor=#E9E9E9
| 177571 ||  || — || March 27, 2004 || Socorro || LINEAR || — || align=right | 2.4 km || 
|-id=572 bgcolor=#E9E9E9
| 177572 ||  || — || March 27, 2004 || Socorro || LINEAR || — || align=right | 4.3 km || 
|-id=573 bgcolor=#E9E9E9
| 177573 ||  || — || March 23, 2004 || Kitt Peak || Spacewatch || HEN || align=right | 1.4 km || 
|-id=574 bgcolor=#d6d6d6
| 177574 ||  || — || March 26, 2004 || Socorro || LINEAR || — || align=right | 4.6 km || 
|-id=575 bgcolor=#E9E9E9
| 177575 ||  || — || March 29, 2004 || Kitt Peak || Spacewatch || — || align=right | 1.6 km || 
|-id=576 bgcolor=#E9E9E9
| 177576 ||  || — || March 17, 2004 || Socorro || LINEAR || — || align=right | 2.7 km || 
|-id=577 bgcolor=#E9E9E9
| 177577 ||  || — || March 30, 2004 || Kitt Peak || Spacewatch || — || align=right | 1.5 km || 
|-id=578 bgcolor=#d6d6d6
| 177578 ||  || — || March 17, 2004 || Kitt Peak || Spacewatch || KAR || align=right | 1.5 km || 
|-id=579 bgcolor=#E9E9E9
| 177579 ||  || — || March 18, 2004 || Kitt Peak || Spacewatch || — || align=right | 2.2 km || 
|-id=580 bgcolor=#E9E9E9
| 177580 ||  || — || April 12, 2004 || Siding Spring || SSS || — || align=right | 1.9 km || 
|-id=581 bgcolor=#E9E9E9
| 177581 ||  || — || April 12, 2004 || Anderson Mesa || LONEOS || — || align=right | 2.0 km || 
|-id=582 bgcolor=#E9E9E9
| 177582 ||  || — || April 12, 2004 || Anderson Mesa || LONEOS || NEM || align=right | 3.1 km || 
|-id=583 bgcolor=#E9E9E9
| 177583 ||  || — || April 10, 2004 || Kvistaberg || UDAS || MAR || align=right | 1.9 km || 
|-id=584 bgcolor=#E9E9E9
| 177584 ||  || — || April 13, 2004 || Socorro || LINEAR || — || align=right | 4.1 km || 
|-id=585 bgcolor=#E9E9E9
| 177585 ||  || — || April 13, 2004 || Palomar || NEAT || JUN || align=right | 2.2 km || 
|-id=586 bgcolor=#E9E9E9
| 177586 ||  || — || April 13, 2004 || Catalina || CSS || — || align=right | 1.8 km || 
|-id=587 bgcolor=#E9E9E9
| 177587 ||  || — || April 10, 2004 || Palomar || NEAT || — || align=right | 5.5 km || 
|-id=588 bgcolor=#E9E9E9
| 177588 ||  || — || April 10, 2004 || Catalina || CSS || EUN || align=right | 2.3 km || 
|-id=589 bgcolor=#d6d6d6
| 177589 ||  || — || April 11, 2004 || Palomar || NEAT || — || align=right | 5.9 km || 
|-id=590 bgcolor=#E9E9E9
| 177590 ||  || — || April 14, 2004 || Anderson Mesa || LONEOS || AEO || align=right | 2.3 km || 
|-id=591 bgcolor=#E9E9E9
| 177591 ||  || — || April 14, 2004 || Anderson Mesa || LONEOS || DOR || align=right | 3.7 km || 
|-id=592 bgcolor=#E9E9E9
| 177592 ||  || — || April 15, 2004 || Catalina || CSS || — || align=right | 2.6 km || 
|-id=593 bgcolor=#E9E9E9
| 177593 ||  || — || April 15, 2004 || Siding Spring || SSS || — || align=right | 3.4 km || 
|-id=594 bgcolor=#E9E9E9
| 177594 ||  || — || April 12, 2004 || Siding Spring || SSS || CLO || align=right | 3.5 km || 
|-id=595 bgcolor=#E9E9E9
| 177595 ||  || — || April 12, 2004 || Palomar || NEAT || — || align=right | 2.5 km || 
|-id=596 bgcolor=#d6d6d6
| 177596 ||  || — || April 12, 2004 || Kitt Peak || Spacewatch || — || align=right | 3.9 km || 
|-id=597 bgcolor=#E9E9E9
| 177597 ||  || — || April 12, 2004 || Kitt Peak || Spacewatch || — || align=right | 2.5 km || 
|-id=598 bgcolor=#E9E9E9
| 177598 ||  || — || April 12, 2004 || Kitt Peak || Spacewatch || — || align=right | 1.6 km || 
|-id=599 bgcolor=#E9E9E9
| 177599 ||  || — || April 14, 2004 || Kitt Peak || Spacewatch || AGN || align=right | 1.5 km || 
|-id=600 bgcolor=#E9E9E9
| 177600 ||  || — || April 12, 2004 || Palomar || NEAT || — || align=right | 3.1 km || 
|}

177601–177700 

|-bgcolor=#fefefe
| 177601 ||  || — || April 14, 2004 || Bergisch Gladbach || W. Bickel || — || align=right | 1.2 km || 
|-id=602 bgcolor=#E9E9E9
| 177602 ||  || — || April 15, 2004 || Socorro || LINEAR || — || align=right | 4.0 km || 
|-id=603 bgcolor=#E9E9E9
| 177603 ||  || — || April 14, 2004 || Anderson Mesa || LONEOS || — || align=right | 3.6 km || 
|-id=604 bgcolor=#d6d6d6
| 177604 ||  || — || April 15, 2004 || Siding Spring || SSS || — || align=right | 4.7 km || 
|-id=605 bgcolor=#E9E9E9
| 177605 ||  || — || April 9, 2004 || Siding Spring || SSS || — || align=right | 1.7 km || 
|-id=606 bgcolor=#E9E9E9
| 177606 ||  || — || April 13, 2004 || Catalina || CSS || — || align=right | 2.2 km || 
|-id=607 bgcolor=#E9E9E9
| 177607 ||  || — || April 19, 2004 || Siding Spring || SSS || BRU || align=right | 6.0 km || 
|-id=608 bgcolor=#E9E9E9
| 177608 ||  || — || April 16, 2004 || Palomar || NEAT || — || align=right | 3.1 km || 
|-id=609 bgcolor=#E9E9E9
| 177609 ||  || — || April 16, 2004 || Socorro || LINEAR || — || align=right | 2.5 km || 
|-id=610 bgcolor=#E9E9E9
| 177610 ||  || — || April 17, 2004 || Socorro || LINEAR || — || align=right | 4.4 km || 
|-id=611 bgcolor=#E9E9E9
| 177611 ||  || — || April 16, 2004 || Kitt Peak || Spacewatch || AGN || align=right | 1.8 km || 
|-id=612 bgcolor=#E9E9E9
| 177612 ||  || — || April 16, 2004 || Socorro || LINEAR || — || align=right | 4.3 km || 
|-id=613 bgcolor=#d6d6d6
| 177613 ||  || — || April 16, 2004 || Palomar || NEAT || — || align=right | 4.5 km || 
|-id=614 bgcolor=#FFC2E0
| 177614 ||  || — || April 21, 2004 || Socorro || LINEAR || APO +1kmPHA || align=right | 1.1 km || 
|-id=615 bgcolor=#E9E9E9
| 177615 ||  || — || April 21, 2004 || Socorro || LINEAR || — || align=right | 4.1 km || 
|-id=616 bgcolor=#E9E9E9
| 177616 ||  || — || April 22, 2004 || Siding Spring || SSS || GEF || align=right | 2.3 km || 
|-id=617 bgcolor=#E9E9E9
| 177617 ||  || — || April 22, 2004 || Siding Spring || SSS || — || align=right | 4.2 km || 
|-id=618 bgcolor=#E9E9E9
| 177618 ||  || — || April 22, 2004 || Catalina || CSS || TIN || align=right | 3.0 km || 
|-id=619 bgcolor=#E9E9E9
| 177619 ||  || — || April 24, 2004 || Siding Spring || SSS || — || align=right | 3.6 km || 
|-id=620 bgcolor=#d6d6d6
| 177620 ||  || — || April 22, 2004 || Kitt Peak || Spacewatch || KOR || align=right | 1.5 km || 
|-id=621 bgcolor=#E9E9E9
| 177621 ||  || — || April 25, 2004 || Socorro || LINEAR || — || align=right | 1.8 km || 
|-id=622 bgcolor=#E9E9E9
| 177622 ||  || — || April 25, 2004 || Socorro || LINEAR || — || align=right | 2.6 km || 
|-id=623 bgcolor=#E9E9E9
| 177623 ||  || — || April 25, 2004 || Socorro || LINEAR || — || align=right | 2.0 km || 
|-id=624 bgcolor=#d6d6d6
| 177624 ||  || — || April 28, 2004 || Kitt Peak || Spacewatch || HYG || align=right | 3.5 km || 
|-id=625 bgcolor=#E9E9E9
| 177625 Dembicky || 2004 JD ||  || May 8, 2004 || Wrightwood || J. W. Young || — || align=right | 3.3 km || 
|-id=626 bgcolor=#d6d6d6
| 177626 ||  || — || May 9, 2004 || Kitt Peak || Spacewatch || HYG || align=right | 3.6 km || 
|-id=627 bgcolor=#d6d6d6
| 177627 ||  || — || May 13, 2004 || Socorro || LINEAR || — || align=right | 3.7 km || 
|-id=628 bgcolor=#d6d6d6
| 177628 ||  || — || May 13, 2004 || Palomar || NEAT || — || align=right | 2.7 km || 
|-id=629 bgcolor=#d6d6d6
| 177629 ||  || — || May 15, 2004 || Socorro || LINEAR || LIX || align=right | 6.4 km || 
|-id=630 bgcolor=#d6d6d6
| 177630 ||  || — || May 15, 2004 || Socorro || LINEAR || HYG || align=right | 5.0 km || 
|-id=631 bgcolor=#E9E9E9
| 177631 ||  || — || May 15, 2004 || Socorro || LINEAR || — || align=right | 1.5 km || 
|-id=632 bgcolor=#d6d6d6
| 177632 ||  || — || May 13, 2004 || Kitt Peak || Spacewatch || — || align=right | 3.7 km || 
|-id=633 bgcolor=#E9E9E9
| 177633 ||  || — || May 10, 2004 || Kitt Peak || Spacewatch || HOF || align=right | 4.2 km || 
|-id=634 bgcolor=#d6d6d6
| 177634 ||  || — || May 16, 2004 || Siding Spring || SSS || — || align=right | 3.3 km || 
|-id=635 bgcolor=#d6d6d6
| 177635 ||  || — || June 11, 2004 || Palomar || NEAT || — || align=right | 5.6 km || 
|-id=636 bgcolor=#E9E9E9
| 177636 ||  || — || June 13, 2004 || Socorro || LINEAR || — || align=right | 4.6 km || 
|-id=637 bgcolor=#E9E9E9
| 177637 ||  || — || June 11, 2004 || Socorro || LINEAR || EUN || align=right | 2.5 km || 
|-id=638 bgcolor=#d6d6d6
| 177638 ||  || — || June 13, 2004 || Kitt Peak || Spacewatch || EOS || align=right | 5.4 km || 
|-id=639 bgcolor=#d6d6d6
| 177639 ||  || — || June 14, 2004 || Kitt Peak || Spacewatch || — || align=right | 4.3 km || 
|-id=640 bgcolor=#d6d6d6
| 177640 ||  || — || July 10, 2004 || Catalina || CSS || HIL3:2 || align=right | 12 km || 
|-id=641 bgcolor=#d6d6d6
| 177641 ||  || — || July 14, 2004 || Socorro || LINEAR || HYG || align=right | 3.2 km || 
|-id=642 bgcolor=#d6d6d6
| 177642 ||  || — || July 11, 2004 || Socorro || LINEAR || — || align=right | 6.4 km || 
|-id=643 bgcolor=#d6d6d6
| 177643 ||  || — || July 16, 2004 || Socorro || LINEAR || — || align=right | 4.7 km || 
|-id=644 bgcolor=#d6d6d6
| 177644 ||  || — || August 11, 2004 || Palomar || NEAT || EUP || align=right | 6.7 km || 
|-id=645 bgcolor=#d6d6d6
| 177645 ||  || — || August 9, 2004 || Campo Imperatore || CINEOS || — || align=right | 3.3 km || 
|-id=646 bgcolor=#d6d6d6
| 177646 ||  || — || September 8, 2004 || Socorro || LINEAR || — || align=right | 4.6 km || 
|-id=647 bgcolor=#fefefe
| 177647 ||  || — || September 6, 2004 || Socorro || LINEAR || H || align=right data-sort-value="0.99" | 990 m || 
|-id=648 bgcolor=#d6d6d6
| 177648 ||  || — || September 10, 2004 || Socorro || LINEAR || — || align=right | 4.0 km || 
|-id=649 bgcolor=#fefefe
| 177649 ||  || — || October 6, 2004 || Socorro || LINEAR || H || align=right | 1.5 km || 
|-id=650 bgcolor=#fefefe
| 177650 ||  || — || November 4, 2004 || Socorro || LINEAR || H || align=right data-sort-value="0.92" | 920 m || 
|-id=651 bgcolor=#FFC2E0
| 177651 ||  || — || December 10, 2004 || Catalina || CSS || APO +1km || align=right | 1.1 km || 
|-id=652 bgcolor=#fefefe
| 177652 ||  || — || December 15, 2004 || Catalina || CSS || H || align=right data-sort-value="0.88" | 880 m || 
|-id=653 bgcolor=#fefefe
| 177653 ||  || — || December 12, 2004 || Kitt Peak || Spacewatch || — || align=right | 1.1 km || 
|-id=654 bgcolor=#fefefe
| 177654 ||  || — || December 16, 2004 || Catalina || CSS || H || align=right | 1.1 km || 
|-id=655 bgcolor=#C2FFFF
| 177655 ||  || — || January 11, 2005 || Socorro || LINEAR || L5 || align=right | 19 km || 
|-id=656 bgcolor=#fefefe
| 177656 ||  || — || February 2, 2005 || Catalina || CSS || H || align=right | 1.0 km || 
|-id=657 bgcolor=#fefefe
| 177657 ||  || — || February 2, 2005 || Catalina || CSS || NYS || align=right | 1.0 km || 
|-id=658 bgcolor=#E9E9E9
| 177658 ||  || — || February 1, 2005 || Kitt Peak || Spacewatch || — || align=right | 2.3 km || 
|-id=659 bgcolor=#fefefe
| 177659 Paolacel ||  ||  || February 9, 2005 || La Silla || A. Boattini, H. Scholl || — || align=right | 1.3 km || 
|-id=660 bgcolor=#fefefe
| 177660 ||  || — || March 3, 2005 || Socorro || LINEAR || H || align=right | 1.4 km || 
|-id=661 bgcolor=#fefefe
| 177661 ||  || — || March 1, 2005 || Kitt Peak || Spacewatch || NYS || align=right data-sort-value="0.87" | 870 m || 
|-id=662 bgcolor=#fefefe
| 177662 ||  || — || March 1, 2005 || Kitt Peak || Spacewatch || NYS || align=right data-sort-value="0.90" | 900 m || 
|-id=663 bgcolor=#fefefe
| 177663 ||  || — || March 1, 2005 || Kitt Peak || Spacewatch || NYS || align=right | 1.1 km || 
|-id=664 bgcolor=#fefefe
| 177664 ||  || — || March 2, 2005 || Catalina || CSS || — || align=right | 1.1 km || 
|-id=665 bgcolor=#fefefe
| 177665 ||  || — || March 3, 2005 || Kitt Peak || Spacewatch || — || align=right | 1.4 km || 
|-id=666 bgcolor=#fefefe
| 177666 ||  || — || March 3, 2005 || Catalina || CSS || NYS || align=right data-sort-value="0.83" | 830 m || 
|-id=667 bgcolor=#fefefe
| 177667 Schieven ||  ||  || March 3, 2005 || Jarnac || Jarnac Obs. || — || align=right | 1.1 km || 
|-id=668 bgcolor=#fefefe
| 177668 ||  || — || March 2, 2005 || Catalina || CSS || H || align=right | 1.1 km || 
|-id=669 bgcolor=#fefefe
| 177669 ||  || — || March 3, 2005 || Catalina || CSS || NYS || align=right | 2.4 km || 
|-id=670 bgcolor=#fefefe
| 177670 ||  || — || March 3, 2005 || Catalina || CSS || NYS || align=right data-sort-value="0.86" | 860 m || 
|-id=671 bgcolor=#fefefe
| 177671 ||  || — || March 3, 2005 || Kitt Peak || Spacewatch || — || align=right | 1.1 km || 
|-id=672 bgcolor=#fefefe
| 177672 ||  || — || March 4, 2005 || Kitt Peak || Spacewatch || NYS || align=right data-sort-value="0.84" | 840 m || 
|-id=673 bgcolor=#fefefe
| 177673 ||  || — || March 7, 2005 || Socorro || LINEAR || — || align=right | 1.0 km || 
|-id=674 bgcolor=#fefefe
| 177674 ||  || — || March 7, 2005 || Siding Spring || SSS || — || align=right | 1.5 km || 
|-id=675 bgcolor=#fefefe
| 177675 ||  || — || March 3, 2005 || Catalina || CSS || V || align=right data-sort-value="0.96" | 960 m || 
|-id=676 bgcolor=#fefefe
| 177676 ||  || — || March 9, 2005 || Mount Lemmon || Mount Lemmon Survey || V || align=right data-sort-value="0.98" | 980 m || 
|-id=677 bgcolor=#fefefe
| 177677 ||  || — || March 9, 2005 || Mount Lemmon || Mount Lemmon Survey || — || align=right | 1.4 km || 
|-id=678 bgcolor=#fefefe
| 177678 ||  || — || March 12, 2005 || Mount Lemmon || Mount Lemmon Survey || — || align=right | 1.3 km || 
|-id=679 bgcolor=#fefefe
| 177679 ||  || — || March 12, 2005 || Kitt Peak || Spacewatch || — || align=right data-sort-value="0.94" | 940 m || 
|-id=680 bgcolor=#fefefe
| 177680 ||  || — || March 8, 2005 || Mount Lemmon || Mount Lemmon Survey || — || align=right data-sort-value="0.85" | 850 m || 
|-id=681 bgcolor=#fefefe
| 177681 ||  || — || March 12, 2005 || Kitt Peak || Spacewatch || FLO || align=right data-sort-value="0.74" | 740 m || 
|-id=682 bgcolor=#fefefe
| 177682 ||  || — || March 10, 2005 || Mount Lemmon || Mount Lemmon Survey || — || align=right | 1.0 km || 
|-id=683 bgcolor=#fefefe
| 177683 ||  || — || March 10, 2005 || Anderson Mesa || LONEOS || — || align=right | 1.2 km || 
|-id=684 bgcolor=#fefefe
| 177684 ||  || — || March 11, 2005 || Anderson Mesa || LONEOS || — || align=right | 1.1 km || 
|-id=685 bgcolor=#fefefe
| 177685 ||  || — || March 13, 2005 || Kitt Peak || Spacewatch || ERI || align=right | 2.1 km || 
|-id=686 bgcolor=#fefefe
| 177686 ||  || — || March 13, 2005 || Catalina || CSS || — || align=right | 1.1 km || 
|-id=687 bgcolor=#fefefe
| 177687 ||  || — || March 14, 2005 || Mount Lemmon || Mount Lemmon Survey || — || align=right | 1.0 km || 
|-id=688 bgcolor=#fefefe
| 177688 ||  || — || March 10, 2005 || Catalina || CSS || V || align=right data-sort-value="0.87" | 870 m || 
|-id=689 bgcolor=#fefefe
| 177689 ||  || — || March 11, 2005 || Mount Lemmon || Mount Lemmon Survey || NYS || align=right data-sort-value="0.90" | 900 m || 
|-id=690 bgcolor=#fefefe
| 177690 ||  || — || March 16, 2005 || Goodricke-Pigott || R. A. Tucker || NYS || align=right data-sort-value="0.94" | 940 m || 
|-id=691 bgcolor=#fefefe
| 177691 ||  || — || April 1, 2005 || Kitt Peak || Spacewatch || — || align=right | 1.1 km || 
|-id=692 bgcolor=#fefefe
| 177692 ||  || — || April 1, 2005 || Kitt Peak || Spacewatch || NYS || align=right data-sort-value="0.70" | 700 m || 
|-id=693 bgcolor=#fefefe
| 177693 ||  || — || April 1, 2005 || Kitt Peak || Spacewatch || NYS || align=right data-sort-value="0.71" | 710 m || 
|-id=694 bgcolor=#fefefe
| 177694 ||  || — || April 1, 2005 || Anderson Mesa || LONEOS || V || align=right data-sort-value="0.93" | 930 m || 
|-id=695 bgcolor=#fefefe
| 177695 ||  || — || April 2, 2005 || Mount Lemmon || Mount Lemmon Survey || — || align=right | 1.3 km || 
|-id=696 bgcolor=#fefefe
| 177696 ||  || — || April 1, 2005 || Anderson Mesa || LONEOS || — || align=right | 1.2 km || 
|-id=697 bgcolor=#fefefe
| 177697 ||  || — || April 1, 2005 || Kitt Peak || Spacewatch || — || align=right | 1.3 km || 
|-id=698 bgcolor=#fefefe
| 177698 ||  || — || April 2, 2005 || Anderson Mesa || LONEOS || FLO || align=right | 1.0 km || 
|-id=699 bgcolor=#fefefe
| 177699 ||  || — || April 4, 2005 || Kitt Peak || Spacewatch || FLO || align=right data-sort-value="0.77" | 770 m || 
|-id=700 bgcolor=#fefefe
| 177700 ||  || — || April 2, 2005 || Mount Lemmon || Mount Lemmon Survey || V || align=right data-sort-value="0.99" | 990 m || 
|}

177701–177800 

|-bgcolor=#E9E9E9
| 177701 ||  || — || April 2, 2005 || Mount Lemmon || Mount Lemmon Survey || — || align=right | 1.8 km || 
|-id=702 bgcolor=#fefefe
| 177702 ||  || — || April 4, 2005 || Kitt Peak || Spacewatch || NYS || align=right | 1.4 km || 
|-id=703 bgcolor=#fefefe
| 177703 ||  || — || April 4, 2005 || Catalina || CSS || — || align=right | 1.0 km || 
|-id=704 bgcolor=#fefefe
| 177704 ||  || — || April 4, 2005 || Catalina || CSS || — || align=right | 1.2 km || 
|-id=705 bgcolor=#fefefe
| 177705 ||  || — || April 6, 2005 || Mount Lemmon || Mount Lemmon Survey || — || align=right | 1.0 km || 
|-id=706 bgcolor=#fefefe
| 177706 ||  || — || April 6, 2005 || Kitt Peak || Spacewatch || FLO || align=right data-sort-value="0.98" | 980 m || 
|-id=707 bgcolor=#fefefe
| 177707 ||  || — || April 6, 2005 || Kitt Peak || Spacewatch || — || align=right | 1.4 km || 
|-id=708 bgcolor=#fefefe
| 177708 ||  || — || April 9, 2005 || Mount Lemmon || Mount Lemmon Survey || — || align=right data-sort-value="0.83" | 830 m || 
|-id=709 bgcolor=#fefefe
| 177709 ||  || — || April 6, 2005 || Mount Lemmon || Mount Lemmon Survey || MAS || align=right | 1.0 km || 
|-id=710 bgcolor=#fefefe
| 177710 ||  || — || April 10, 2005 || Mount Lemmon || Mount Lemmon Survey || NYS || align=right data-sort-value="0.94" | 940 m || 
|-id=711 bgcolor=#fefefe
| 177711 ||  || — || April 9, 2005 || Socorro || LINEAR || — || align=right | 1.1 km || 
|-id=712 bgcolor=#fefefe
| 177712 ||  || — || April 12, 2005 || Mount Lemmon || Mount Lemmon Survey || FLO || align=right data-sort-value="0.76" | 760 m || 
|-id=713 bgcolor=#fefefe
| 177713 ||  || — || April 14, 2005 || Reedy Creek || J. Broughton || — || align=right | 2.8 km || 
|-id=714 bgcolor=#fefefe
| 177714 ||  || — || April 11, 2005 || Kitt Peak || Spacewatch || — || align=right data-sort-value="0.92" | 920 m || 
|-id=715 bgcolor=#fefefe
| 177715 ||  || — || April 9, 2005 || Socorro || LINEAR || — || align=right | 1.0 km || 
|-id=716 bgcolor=#fefefe
| 177716 ||  || — || April 12, 2005 || Kitt Peak || Spacewatch || — || align=right data-sort-value="0.96" | 960 m || 
|-id=717 bgcolor=#E9E9E9
| 177717 ||  || — || April 13, 2005 || Socorro || LINEAR || — || align=right | 1.7 km || 
|-id=718 bgcolor=#fefefe
| 177718 ||  || — || April 13, 2005 || Catalina || CSS || — || align=right | 2.0 km || 
|-id=719 bgcolor=#fefefe
| 177719 ||  || — || April 11, 2005 || Mount Lemmon || Mount Lemmon Survey || — || align=right | 1.3 km || 
|-id=720 bgcolor=#fefefe
| 177720 ||  || — || April 14, 2005 || Kitt Peak || Spacewatch || — || align=right data-sort-value="0.98" | 980 m || 
|-id=721 bgcolor=#fefefe
| 177721 ||  || — || April 5, 2005 || Kitt Peak || Spacewatch || — || align=right | 1.0 km || 
|-id=722 bgcolor=#fefefe
| 177722 Pelletier ||  ||  || April 11, 2005 || Kitt Peak || M. W. Buie || — || align=right data-sort-value="0.99" | 990 m || 
|-id=723 bgcolor=#fefefe
| 177723 ||  || — || April 7, 2005 || Kitt Peak || Spacewatch || — || align=right data-sort-value="0.99" | 990 m || 
|-id=724 bgcolor=#E9E9E9
| 177724 ||  || — || April 12, 2005 || Siding Spring || SSS || — || align=right | 2.2 km || 
|-id=725 bgcolor=#fefefe
| 177725 ||  || — || April 16, 2005 || Kitt Peak || Spacewatch || — || align=right | 1.7 km || 
|-id=726 bgcolor=#fefefe
| 177726 ||  || — || April 30, 2005 || Kitt Peak || Spacewatch || — || align=right | 1.3 km || 
|-id=727 bgcolor=#fefefe
| 177727 || 2005 JP || — || May 3, 2005 || Kitt Peak || Spacewatch || MAS || align=right | 1.2 km || 
|-id=728 bgcolor=#fefefe
| 177728 ||  || — || May 3, 2005 || Catalina || CSS || NYS || align=right | 1.0 km || 
|-id=729 bgcolor=#E9E9E9
| 177729 ||  || — || May 3, 2005 || Socorro || LINEAR || — || align=right | 3.2 km || 
|-id=730 bgcolor=#fefefe
| 177730 ||  || — || May 3, 2005 || Catalina || CSS || — || align=right | 1.9 km || 
|-id=731 bgcolor=#fefefe
| 177731 ||  || — || May 4, 2005 || Catalina || CSS || FLO || align=right data-sort-value="0.85" | 850 m || 
|-id=732 bgcolor=#d6d6d6
| 177732 ||  || — || May 4, 2005 || Palomar || NEAT || KOR || align=right | 2.1 km || 
|-id=733 bgcolor=#fefefe
| 177733 ||  || — || May 4, 2005 || Siding Spring || SSS || NYS || align=right data-sort-value="0.87" | 870 m || 
|-id=734 bgcolor=#fefefe
| 177734 ||  || — || May 1, 2005 || Palomar || NEAT || — || align=right | 1.3 km || 
|-id=735 bgcolor=#fefefe
| 177735 ||  || — || May 3, 2005 || Kitt Peak || Spacewatch || V || align=right data-sort-value="0.98" | 980 m || 
|-id=736 bgcolor=#fefefe
| 177736 ||  || — || May 3, 2005 || Kitt Peak || Spacewatch || — || align=right | 1.2 km || 
|-id=737 bgcolor=#fefefe
| 177737 ||  || — || May 3, 2005 || Socorro || LINEAR || FLO || align=right | 1.1 km || 
|-id=738 bgcolor=#fefefe
| 177738 ||  || — || May 4, 2005 || Anderson Mesa || LONEOS || FLO || align=right data-sort-value="0.94" | 940 m || 
|-id=739 bgcolor=#E9E9E9
| 177739 ||  || — || May 6, 2005 || Socorro || LINEAR || — || align=right | 2.0 km || 
|-id=740 bgcolor=#fefefe
| 177740 ||  || — || May 6, 2005 || Haleakala || NEAT || — || align=right | 1.4 km || 
|-id=741 bgcolor=#fefefe
| 177741 ||  || — || May 8, 2005 || Anderson Mesa || LONEOS || — || align=right | 1.1 km || 
|-id=742 bgcolor=#fefefe
| 177742 ||  || — || May 8, 2005 || Kitt Peak || Spacewatch || — || align=right | 1.5 km || 
|-id=743 bgcolor=#E9E9E9
| 177743 ||  || — || May 8, 2005 || Socorro || LINEAR || — || align=right | 1.6 km || 
|-id=744 bgcolor=#fefefe
| 177744 ||  || — || May 4, 2005 || Siding Spring || SSS || — || align=right | 1.4 km || 
|-id=745 bgcolor=#fefefe
| 177745 ||  || — || May 8, 2005 || Mount Lemmon || Mount Lemmon Survey || — || align=right | 1.2 km || 
|-id=746 bgcolor=#fefefe
| 177746 ||  || — || May 4, 2005 || Mount Lemmon || Mount Lemmon Survey || V || align=right | 1.1 km || 
|-id=747 bgcolor=#E9E9E9
| 177747 ||  || — || May 4, 2005 || Palomar || NEAT || — || align=right | 1.4 km || 
|-id=748 bgcolor=#E9E9E9
| 177748 ||  || — || May 4, 2005 || Palomar || NEAT || — || align=right | 2.9 km || 
|-id=749 bgcolor=#E9E9E9
| 177749 ||  || — || May 7, 2005 || Kitt Peak || Spacewatch || — || align=right | 1.8 km || 
|-id=750 bgcolor=#fefefe
| 177750 ||  || — || May 8, 2005 || Kitt Peak || Spacewatch || V || align=right | 1.1 km || 
|-id=751 bgcolor=#fefefe
| 177751 ||  || — || May 8, 2005 || Siding Spring || SSS || — || align=right | 1.5 km || 
|-id=752 bgcolor=#fefefe
| 177752 ||  || — || May 9, 2005 || Anderson Mesa || LONEOS || FLO || align=right data-sort-value="0.95" | 950 m || 
|-id=753 bgcolor=#fefefe
| 177753 ||  || — || May 8, 2005 || Kitt Peak || Spacewatch || NYS || align=right data-sort-value="0.69" | 690 m || 
|-id=754 bgcolor=#fefefe
| 177754 ||  || — || May 8, 2005 || Mount Lemmon || Mount Lemmon Survey || MAS || align=right data-sort-value="0.95" | 950 m || 
|-id=755 bgcolor=#fefefe
| 177755 ||  || — || May 11, 2005 || Palomar || NEAT || FLO || align=right | 1.0 km || 
|-id=756 bgcolor=#fefefe
| 177756 ||  || — || May 11, 2005 || Kitt Peak || Spacewatch || — || align=right | 1.4 km || 
|-id=757 bgcolor=#E9E9E9
| 177757 ||  || — || May 11, 2005 || Palomar || NEAT || — || align=right | 1.5 km || 
|-id=758 bgcolor=#fefefe
| 177758 ||  || — || May 11, 2005 || Palomar || NEAT || — || align=right | 1.3 km || 
|-id=759 bgcolor=#fefefe
| 177759 ||  || — || May 12, 2005 || Mount Lemmon || Mount Lemmon Survey || — || align=right | 1.4 km || 
|-id=760 bgcolor=#E9E9E9
| 177760 ||  || — || May 12, 2005 || Catalina || CSS || ADE || align=right | 3.5 km || 
|-id=761 bgcolor=#E9E9E9
| 177761 ||  || — || May 10, 2005 || Kitt Peak || Spacewatch || — || align=right | 1.8 km || 
|-id=762 bgcolor=#fefefe
| 177762 ||  || — || May 11, 2005 || Mount Lemmon || Mount Lemmon Survey || NYS || align=right data-sort-value="0.83" | 830 m || 
|-id=763 bgcolor=#E9E9E9
| 177763 ||  || — || May 11, 2005 || Palomar || NEAT || — || align=right | 2.0 km || 
|-id=764 bgcolor=#fefefe
| 177764 ||  || — || May 12, 2005 || Mount Lemmon || Mount Lemmon Survey || NYS || align=right | 1.2 km || 
|-id=765 bgcolor=#fefefe
| 177765 ||  || — || May 12, 2005 || Socorro || LINEAR || — || align=right | 1.2 km || 
|-id=766 bgcolor=#E9E9E9
| 177766 ||  || — || May 12, 2005 || Kitt Peak || Spacewatch || RAF || align=right | 1.6 km || 
|-id=767 bgcolor=#fefefe
| 177767 ||  || — || May 13, 2005 || Kitt Peak || Spacewatch || FLO || align=right data-sort-value="0.98" | 980 m || 
|-id=768 bgcolor=#fefefe
| 177768 ||  || — || May 13, 2005 || Kitt Peak || Spacewatch || — || align=right | 1.2 km || 
|-id=769 bgcolor=#E9E9E9
| 177769 ||  || — || May 13, 2005 || Mount Lemmon || Mount Lemmon Survey || — || align=right | 1.4 km || 
|-id=770 bgcolor=#E9E9E9
| 177770 Saulanwu ||  ||  || May 8, 2005 || Mount Lemmon || Mount Lemmon Survey || — || align=right | 2.0 km || 
|-id=771 bgcolor=#E9E9E9
| 177771 Bretz ||  ||  || May 10, 2005 || Mount Lemmon || Mount Lemmon Survey || — || align=right | 1.7 km || 
|-id=772 bgcolor=#E9E9E9
| 177772 ||  || — || May 8, 2005 || Mount Lemmon || Mount Lemmon Survey || — || align=right | 1.7 km || 
|-id=773 bgcolor=#E9E9E9
| 177773 ||  || — || May 12, 2005 || Anderson Mesa || LONEOS || — || align=right | 1.5 km || 
|-id=774 bgcolor=#fefefe
| 177774 ||  || — || May 16, 2005 || Kitt Peak || Spacewatch || V || align=right | 1.0 km || 
|-id=775 bgcolor=#fefefe
| 177775 ||  || — || May 16, 2005 || Mount Lemmon || Mount Lemmon Survey || V || align=right | 1.1 km || 
|-id=776 bgcolor=#fefefe
| 177776 ||  || — || May 18, 2005 || Siding Spring || SSS || — || align=right data-sort-value="0.96" | 960 m || 
|-id=777 bgcolor=#fefefe
| 177777 ||  || — || May 18, 2005 || Palomar || NEAT || — || align=right data-sort-value="0.87" | 870 m || 
|-id=778 bgcolor=#fefefe
| 177778 ||  || — || May 19, 2005 || Mount Lemmon || Mount Lemmon Survey || NYS || align=right | 1.0 km || 
|-id=779 bgcolor=#fefefe
| 177779 ||  || — || May 18, 2005 || Siding Spring || SSS || — || align=right | 1.1 km || 
|-id=780 bgcolor=#fefefe
| 177780 ||  || — || May 29, 2005 || Siding Spring || SSS || NYS || align=right | 1.2 km || 
|-id=781 bgcolor=#fefefe
| 177781 ||  || — || May 22, 2005 || Palomar || NEAT || NYS || align=right | 1.1 km || 
|-id=782 bgcolor=#fefefe
| 177782 ||  || — || June 3, 2005 || Reedy Creek || J. Broughton || NYS || align=right data-sort-value="0.95" | 950 m || 
|-id=783 bgcolor=#fefefe
| 177783 ||  || — || June 2, 2005 || Catalina || CSS || — || align=right data-sort-value="0.95" | 950 m || 
|-id=784 bgcolor=#fefefe
| 177784 ||  || — || June 2, 2005 || Siding Spring || SSS || ERI || align=right | 2.2 km || 
|-id=785 bgcolor=#fefefe
| 177785 ||  || — || June 5, 2005 || Socorro || LINEAR || FLO || align=right data-sort-value="0.97" | 970 m || 
|-id=786 bgcolor=#fefefe
| 177786 ||  || — || June 5, 2005 || Socorro || LINEAR || — || align=right data-sort-value="0.97" | 970 m || 
|-id=787 bgcolor=#fefefe
| 177787 ||  || — || June 6, 2005 || Kitt Peak || Spacewatch || — || align=right | 1.1 km || 
|-id=788 bgcolor=#fefefe
| 177788 ||  || — || June 8, 2005 || Kitt Peak || Spacewatch || — || align=right | 1.2 km || 
|-id=789 bgcolor=#E9E9E9
| 177789 ||  || — || June 8, 2005 || Kitt Peak || Spacewatch || — || align=right | 2.3 km || 
|-id=790 bgcolor=#fefefe
| 177790 ||  || — || June 5, 2005 || Socorro || LINEAR || NYS || align=right | 1.1 km || 
|-id=791 bgcolor=#fefefe
| 177791 ||  || — || June 8, 2005 || Kitt Peak || Spacewatch || FLO || align=right data-sort-value="0.97" | 970 m || 
|-id=792 bgcolor=#d6d6d6
| 177792 ||  || — || June 8, 2005 || Kitt Peak || Spacewatch || — || align=right | 3.4 km || 
|-id=793 bgcolor=#fefefe
| 177793 ||  || — || June 6, 2005 || Kitt Peak || Spacewatch || — || align=right | 1.1 km || 
|-id=794 bgcolor=#E9E9E9
| 177794 ||  || — || June 8, 2005 || Kitt Peak || Spacewatch || — || align=right | 2.4 km || 
|-id=795 bgcolor=#fefefe
| 177795 ||  || — || June 9, 2005 || Kitt Peak || Spacewatch || — || align=right | 1.0 km || 
|-id=796 bgcolor=#E9E9E9
| 177796 ||  || — || June 10, 2005 || Kitt Peak || Spacewatch || — || align=right | 2.5 km || 
|-id=797 bgcolor=#d6d6d6
| 177797 ||  || — || June 11, 2005 || Kitt Peak || Spacewatch || — || align=right | 4.3 km || 
|-id=798 bgcolor=#E9E9E9
| 177798 ||  || — || June 13, 2005 || Mount Lemmon || Mount Lemmon Survey || MIS || align=right | 3.1 km || 
|-id=799 bgcolor=#E9E9E9
| 177799 ||  || — || June 13, 2005 || Kitt Peak || Spacewatch || — || align=right | 2.1 km || 
|-id=800 bgcolor=#fefefe
| 177800 ||  || — || June 11, 2005 || Catalina || CSS || FLO || align=right data-sort-value="0.98" | 980 m || 
|}

177801–177900 

|-bgcolor=#E9E9E9
| 177801 ||  || — || June 11, 2005 || Kitt Peak || Spacewatch || — || align=right | 2.5 km || 
|-id=802 bgcolor=#fefefe
| 177802 ||  || — || June 13, 2005 || Mount Lemmon || Mount Lemmon Survey || NYS || align=right | 1.2 km || 
|-id=803 bgcolor=#d6d6d6
| 177803 ||  || — || June 13, 2005 || Mount Lemmon || Mount Lemmon Survey || — || align=right | 4.0 km || 
|-id=804 bgcolor=#fefefe
| 177804 ||  || — || June 1, 2005 || Kitt Peak || Spacewatch || — || align=right | 1.4 km || 
|-id=805 bgcolor=#fefefe
| 177805 ||  || — || June 1, 2005 || Kitt Peak || Spacewatch || V || align=right | 1.1 km || 
|-id=806 bgcolor=#d6d6d6
| 177806 || 2005 MU || — || June 17, 2005 || Mount Lemmon || Mount Lemmon Survey || — || align=right | 3.3 km || 
|-id=807 bgcolor=#d6d6d6
| 177807 ||  || — || June 17, 2005 || Mount Lemmon || Mount Lemmon Survey || EOS || align=right | 2.6 km || 
|-id=808 bgcolor=#E9E9E9
| 177808 ||  || — || June 16, 2005 || Kitt Peak || Spacewatch || GEF || align=right | 2.2 km || 
|-id=809 bgcolor=#E9E9E9
| 177809 ||  || — || June 17, 2005 || Kitt Peak || Spacewatch || MAR || align=right | 1.6 km || 
|-id=810 bgcolor=#E9E9E9
| 177810 ||  || — || June 28, 2005 || Kitt Peak || Spacewatch || — || align=right | 2.2 km || 
|-id=811 bgcolor=#d6d6d6
| 177811 ||  || — || June 28, 2005 || Palomar || NEAT || HYG || align=right | 4.7 km || 
|-id=812 bgcolor=#E9E9E9
| 177812 ||  || — || June 27, 2005 || Kitt Peak || Spacewatch || — || align=right | 2.0 km || 
|-id=813 bgcolor=#E9E9E9
| 177813 ||  || — || June 27, 2005 || Kitt Peak || Spacewatch || — || align=right | 2.8 km || 
|-id=814 bgcolor=#d6d6d6
| 177814 ||  || — || June 27, 2005 || Kitt Peak || Spacewatch || THM || align=right | 4.0 km || 
|-id=815 bgcolor=#E9E9E9
| 177815 ||  || — || June 30, 2005 || Palomar || NEAT || — || align=right | 1.3 km || 
|-id=816 bgcolor=#d6d6d6
| 177816 ||  || — || June 30, 2005 || Kitt Peak || Spacewatch || — || align=right | 3.5 km || 
|-id=817 bgcolor=#E9E9E9
| 177817 ||  || — || June 30, 2005 || Kitt Peak || Spacewatch || — || align=right | 1.4 km || 
|-id=818 bgcolor=#E9E9E9
| 177818 ||  || — || June 30, 2005 || Kitt Peak || Spacewatch || — || align=right | 3.4 km || 
|-id=819 bgcolor=#E9E9E9
| 177819 ||  || — || June 27, 2005 || Palomar || NEAT || — || align=right | 1.4 km || 
|-id=820 bgcolor=#E9E9E9
| 177820 ||  || — || June 29, 2005 || Palomar || NEAT || — || align=right | 3.5 km || 
|-id=821 bgcolor=#d6d6d6
| 177821 ||  || — || July 1, 2005 || Kitt Peak || Spacewatch || TIR || align=right | 5.1 km || 
|-id=822 bgcolor=#d6d6d6
| 177822 ||  || — || July 4, 2005 || Mount Lemmon || Mount Lemmon Survey || EOS || align=right | 2.6 km || 
|-id=823 bgcolor=#d6d6d6
| 177823 ||  || — || July 4, 2005 || Palomar || NEAT || — || align=right | 4.3 km || 
|-id=824 bgcolor=#fefefe
| 177824 ||  || — || July 6, 2005 || Junk Bond || D. Healy || MAS || align=right | 1.0 km || 
|-id=825 bgcolor=#E9E9E9
| 177825 ||  || — || July 2, 2005 || Kitt Peak || Spacewatch || HEN || align=right | 1.4 km || 
|-id=826 bgcolor=#d6d6d6
| 177826 ||  || — || July 4, 2005 || Mount Lemmon || Mount Lemmon Survey || HYG || align=right | 3.4 km || 
|-id=827 bgcolor=#E9E9E9
| 177827 ||  || — || July 4, 2005 || Mount Lemmon || Mount Lemmon Survey || — || align=right | 3.1 km || 
|-id=828 bgcolor=#d6d6d6
| 177828 ||  || — || July 6, 2005 || Kitt Peak || Spacewatch || — || align=right | 2.5 km || 
|-id=829 bgcolor=#d6d6d6
| 177829 ||  || — || July 5, 2005 || Palomar || NEAT || EOS || align=right | 2.6 km || 
|-id=830 bgcolor=#d6d6d6
| 177830 Rubenhagen ||  ||  || July 9, 2005 || Jarnac || Jarnac Obs. || — || align=right | 6.1 km || 
|-id=831 bgcolor=#E9E9E9
| 177831 ||  || — || July 7, 2005 || Kitt Peak || Spacewatch || — || align=right | 2.5 km || 
|-id=832 bgcolor=#E9E9E9
| 177832 ||  || — || July 6, 2005 || Kitt Peak || Spacewatch || — || align=right | 3.0 km || 
|-id=833 bgcolor=#fefefe
| 177833 ||  || — || July 10, 2005 || Catalina || CSS || NYS || align=right | 1.2 km || 
|-id=834 bgcolor=#d6d6d6
| 177834 ||  || — || July 11, 2005 || RAS || A. Lowe || THB || align=right | 5.6 km || 
|-id=835 bgcolor=#E9E9E9
| 177835 ||  || — || July 9, 2005 || Kitt Peak || Spacewatch || — || align=right | 2.9 km || 
|-id=836 bgcolor=#d6d6d6
| 177836 ||  || — || July 1, 2005 || Kitt Peak || Spacewatch || KOR || align=right | 1.8 km || 
|-id=837 bgcolor=#d6d6d6
| 177837 ||  || — || July 4, 2005 || Palomar || NEAT || VER || align=right | 4.4 km || 
|-id=838 bgcolor=#d6d6d6
| 177838 ||  || — || July 4, 2005 || Mount Lemmon || Mount Lemmon Survey || EOS || align=right | 3.1 km || 
|-id=839 bgcolor=#fefefe
| 177839 ||  || — || July 8, 2005 || Kitt Peak || Spacewatch || — || align=right | 1.6 km || 
|-id=840 bgcolor=#fefefe
| 177840 ||  || — || July 10, 2005 || Kitt Peak || Spacewatch || NYS || align=right | 1.1 km || 
|-id=841 bgcolor=#d6d6d6
| 177841 ||  || — || July 10, 2005 || Reedy Creek || J. Broughton || EOS || align=right | 3.3 km || 
|-id=842 bgcolor=#E9E9E9
| 177842 ||  || — || July 7, 2005 || Kitt Peak || Spacewatch || — || align=right | 2.4 km || 
|-id=843 bgcolor=#d6d6d6
| 177843 ||  || — || July 5, 2005 || Palomar || NEAT || — || align=right | 3.0 km || 
|-id=844 bgcolor=#E9E9E9
| 177844 ||  || — || July 12, 2005 || Mount Lemmon || Mount Lemmon Survey || — || align=right | 3.9 km || 
|-id=845 bgcolor=#d6d6d6
| 177845 ||  || — || July 27, 2005 || Palomar || NEAT || — || align=right | 4.8 km || 
|-id=846 bgcolor=#d6d6d6
| 177846 ||  || — || July 27, 2005 || Palomar || NEAT || — || align=right | 5.2 km || 
|-id=847 bgcolor=#d6d6d6
| 177847 ||  || — || July 30, 2005 || Palomar || NEAT || — || align=right | 2.9 km || 
|-id=848 bgcolor=#d6d6d6
| 177848 ||  || — || July 28, 2005 || Palomar || NEAT || — || align=right | 3.6 km || 
|-id=849 bgcolor=#d6d6d6
| 177849 ||  || — || July 30, 2005 || Palomar || NEAT || — || align=right | 4.3 km || 
|-id=850 bgcolor=#d6d6d6
| 177850 ||  || — || July 30, 2005 || Palomar || NEAT || — || align=right | 3.7 km || 
|-id=851 bgcolor=#E9E9E9
| 177851 ||  || — || July 28, 2005 || Palomar || NEAT || — || align=right | 2.9 km || 
|-id=852 bgcolor=#d6d6d6
| 177852 ||  || — || July 30, 2005 || Palomar || NEAT || — || align=right | 4.5 km || 
|-id=853 bgcolor=#E9E9E9
| 177853 Lumezzane ||  ||  || August 5, 2005 || Lumezzane || M. Micheli, G. P. Pizzetti || — || align=right | 1.7 km || 
|-id=854 bgcolor=#d6d6d6
| 177854 ||  || — || August 4, 2005 || Kingsnake || J. V. McClusky || — || align=right | 5.0 km || 
|-id=855 bgcolor=#d6d6d6
| 177855 ||  || — || August 5, 2005 || Palomar || NEAT || — || align=right | 3.5 km || 
|-id=856 bgcolor=#E9E9E9
| 177856 ||  || — || August 5, 2005 || Palomar || NEAT || HOF || align=right | 4.2 km || 
|-id=857 bgcolor=#d6d6d6
| 177857 ||  || — || August 5, 2005 || Palomar || NEAT || — || align=right | 4.6 km || 
|-id=858 bgcolor=#d6d6d6
| 177858 || 2005 QX || — || August 22, 2005 || Palomar || NEAT || EOS || align=right | 3.1 km || 
|-id=859 bgcolor=#d6d6d6
| 177859 ||  || — || August 24, 2005 || Palomar || NEAT || — || align=right | 4.2 km || 
|-id=860 bgcolor=#d6d6d6
| 177860 ||  || — || August 24, 2005 || Palomar || NEAT || EOS || align=right | 3.0 km || 
|-id=861 bgcolor=#d6d6d6
| 177861 ||  || — || August 25, 2005 || Palomar || NEAT || HYG || align=right | 3.8 km || 
|-id=862 bgcolor=#E9E9E9
| 177862 ||  || — || August 24, 2005 || Palomar || NEAT || — || align=right | 4.3 km || 
|-id=863 bgcolor=#d6d6d6
| 177863 ||  || — || August 25, 2005 || Palomar || NEAT || EOS || align=right | 2.5 km || 
|-id=864 bgcolor=#d6d6d6
| 177864 ||  || — || August 25, 2005 || Campo Imperatore || CINEOS || TEL || align=right | 2.0 km || 
|-id=865 bgcolor=#d6d6d6
| 177865 ||  || — || August 26, 2005 || Anderson Mesa || LONEOS || — || align=right | 2.8 km || 
|-id=866 bgcolor=#E9E9E9
| 177866 ||  || — || August 28, 2005 || Vicques || M. Ory || HOF || align=right | 3.8 km || 
|-id=867 bgcolor=#d6d6d6
| 177867 ||  || — || August 24, 2005 || Palomar || NEAT || HYG || align=right | 3.9 km || 
|-id=868 bgcolor=#d6d6d6
| 177868 ||  || — || August 25, 2005 || Palomar || NEAT || KOR || align=right | 2.0 km || 
|-id=869 bgcolor=#d6d6d6
| 177869 ||  || — || August 26, 2005 || Palomar || NEAT || URS || align=right | 5.9 km || 
|-id=870 bgcolor=#d6d6d6
| 177870 ||  || — || August 26, 2005 || Palomar || NEAT || — || align=right | 4.7 km || 
|-id=871 bgcolor=#d6d6d6
| 177871 ||  || — || August 26, 2005 || Palomar || NEAT || — || align=right | 5.2 km || 
|-id=872 bgcolor=#d6d6d6
| 177872 ||  || — || August 25, 2005 || Palomar || NEAT || HYG || align=right | 4.9 km || 
|-id=873 bgcolor=#d6d6d6
| 177873 ||  || — || August 29, 2005 || Socorro || LINEAR || EOS || align=right | 3.7 km || 
|-id=874 bgcolor=#E9E9E9
| 177874 ||  || — || August 29, 2005 || Anderson Mesa || LONEOS || — || align=right | 4.4 km || 
|-id=875 bgcolor=#E9E9E9
| 177875 ||  || — || August 25, 2005 || Palomar || NEAT || — || align=right | 4.1 km || 
|-id=876 bgcolor=#d6d6d6
| 177876 ||  || — || August 29, 2005 || Anderson Mesa || LONEOS || — || align=right | 4.3 km || 
|-id=877 bgcolor=#d6d6d6
| 177877 ||  || — || August 27, 2005 || Palomar || NEAT || — || align=right | 3.7 km || 
|-id=878 bgcolor=#d6d6d6
| 177878 ||  || — || August 27, 2005 || Palomar || NEAT || EOS || align=right | 3.0 km || 
|-id=879 bgcolor=#d6d6d6
| 177879 ||  || — || August 27, 2005 || Palomar || NEAT || 7:4 || align=right | 4.6 km || 
|-id=880 bgcolor=#d6d6d6
| 177880 ||  || — || August 27, 2005 || Palomar || NEAT || CHA || align=right | 3.6 km || 
|-id=881 bgcolor=#d6d6d6
| 177881 ||  || — || August 27, 2005 || Palomar || NEAT || — || align=right | 4.9 km || 
|-id=882 bgcolor=#d6d6d6
| 177882 ||  || — || August 27, 2005 || Palomar || NEAT || — || align=right | 3.6 km || 
|-id=883 bgcolor=#d6d6d6
| 177883 ||  || — || August 28, 2005 || Kitt Peak || Spacewatch || — || align=right | 3.4 km || 
|-id=884 bgcolor=#d6d6d6
| 177884 ||  || — || August 28, 2005 || Kitt Peak || Spacewatch || — || align=right | 3.2 km || 
|-id=885 bgcolor=#d6d6d6
| 177885 ||  || — || August 28, 2005 || Kitt Peak || Spacewatch || HYG || align=right | 4.0 km || 
|-id=886 bgcolor=#d6d6d6
| 177886 ||  || — || August 28, 2005 || Kitt Peak || Spacewatch || — || align=right | 5.9 km || 
|-id=887 bgcolor=#E9E9E9
| 177887 ||  || — || August 29, 2005 || Anderson Mesa || LONEOS || — || align=right | 3.7 km || 
|-id=888 bgcolor=#d6d6d6
| 177888 ||  || — || August 30, 2005 || Socorro || LINEAR || — || align=right | 7.2 km || 
|-id=889 bgcolor=#d6d6d6
| 177889 ||  || — || August 26, 2005 || Palomar || NEAT || — || align=right | 5.1 km || 
|-id=890 bgcolor=#d6d6d6
| 177890 ||  || — || August 28, 2005 || Siding Spring || SSS || — || align=right | 4.6 km || 
|-id=891 bgcolor=#d6d6d6
| 177891 ||  || — || August 28, 2005 || Anderson Mesa || LONEOS || — || align=right | 4.8 km || 
|-id=892 bgcolor=#E9E9E9
| 177892 ||  || — || August 30, 2005 || Anderson Mesa || LONEOS || — || align=right | 3.9 km || 
|-id=893 bgcolor=#d6d6d6
| 177893 ||  || — || August 29, 2005 || Palomar || NEAT || — || align=right | 5.0 km || 
|-id=894 bgcolor=#d6d6d6
| 177894 ||  || — || August 31, 2005 || Palomar || NEAT || HYG || align=right | 3.1 km || 
|-id=895 bgcolor=#d6d6d6
| 177895 ||  || — || August 29, 2005 || Anderson Mesa || LONEOS || 7:4 || align=right | 6.0 km || 
|-id=896 bgcolor=#d6d6d6
| 177896 ||  || — || September 6, 2005 || Socorro || LINEAR || — || align=right | 5.2 km || 
|-id=897 bgcolor=#d6d6d6
| 177897 ||  || — || September 7, 2005 || Altschwendt || Altschwendt Obs. || — || align=right | 5.6 km || 
|-id=898 bgcolor=#d6d6d6
| 177898 ||  || — || September 8, 2005 || Socorro || LINEAR || 3:2 || align=right | 6.8 km || 
|-id=899 bgcolor=#E9E9E9
| 177899 ||  || — || September 9, 2005 || Socorro || LINEAR || — || align=right | 5.3 km || 
|-id=900 bgcolor=#d6d6d6
| 177900 ||  || — || September 11, 2005 || Kitt Peak || Spacewatch || — || align=right | 4.1 km || 
|}

177901–178000 

|-bgcolor=#d6d6d6
| 177901 ||  || — || September 3, 2005 || Mauna Kea || C. Veillet || VER || align=right | 5.3 km || 
|-id=902 bgcolor=#d6d6d6
| 177902 ||  || — || September 6, 2005 || Anderson Mesa || LONEOS || EOS || align=right | 3.5 km || 
|-id=903 bgcolor=#E9E9E9
| 177903 ||  || — || September 12, 2005 || Kitt Peak || Spacewatch || — || align=right | 3.4 km || 
|-id=904 bgcolor=#d6d6d6
| 177904 ||  || — || September 23, 2005 || Catalina || CSS || — || align=right | 5.8 km || 
|-id=905 bgcolor=#d6d6d6
| 177905 ||  || — || September 23, 2005 || Kitt Peak || Spacewatch || HYG || align=right | 4.2 km || 
|-id=906 bgcolor=#d6d6d6
| 177906 ||  || — || September 25, 2005 || Calvin-Rehoboth || Calvin–Rehoboth Obs. || — || align=right | 3.6 km || 
|-id=907 bgcolor=#d6d6d6
| 177907 ||  || — || September 27, 2005 || Kitt Peak || Spacewatch || — || align=right | 5.5 km || 
|-id=908 bgcolor=#d6d6d6
| 177908 ||  || — || September 24, 2005 || Kitt Peak || Spacewatch || KAR || align=right | 1.9 km || 
|-id=909 bgcolor=#d6d6d6
| 177909 ||  || — || September 25, 2005 || Palomar || NEAT || — || align=right | 3.9 km || 
|-id=910 bgcolor=#d6d6d6
| 177910 ||  || — || September 27, 2005 || Kitt Peak || Spacewatch || — || align=right | 4.4 km || 
|-id=911 bgcolor=#d6d6d6
| 177911 ||  || — || September 28, 2005 || Palomar || NEAT || — || align=right | 5.0 km || 
|-id=912 bgcolor=#d6d6d6
| 177912 ||  || — || September 29, 2005 || Palomar || NEAT || — || align=right | 4.7 km || 
|-id=913 bgcolor=#d6d6d6
| 177913 ||  || — || September 25, 2005 || Kitt Peak || Spacewatch || — || align=right | 4.5 km || 
|-id=914 bgcolor=#E9E9E9
| 177914 ||  || — || September 25, 2005 || Kitt Peak || Spacewatch || — || align=right | 2.1 km || 
|-id=915 bgcolor=#d6d6d6
| 177915 ||  || — || September 26, 2005 || Palomar || NEAT || — || align=right | 5.5 km || 
|-id=916 bgcolor=#d6d6d6
| 177916 ||  || — || September 28, 2005 || Palomar || NEAT || — || align=right | 5.0 km || 
|-id=917 bgcolor=#d6d6d6
| 177917 ||  || — || September 29, 2005 || Anderson Mesa || LONEOS || — || align=right | 4.7 km || 
|-id=918 bgcolor=#E9E9E9
| 177918 ||  || — || September 29, 2005 || Mount Lemmon || Mount Lemmon Survey || — || align=right | 4.4 km || 
|-id=919 bgcolor=#d6d6d6
| 177919 ||  || — || September 29, 2005 || Anderson Mesa || LONEOS || VER || align=right | 6.7 km || 
|-id=920 bgcolor=#d6d6d6
| 177920 ||  || — || September 29, 2005 || Palomar || NEAT || 7:4 || align=right | 6.5 km || 
|-id=921 bgcolor=#d6d6d6
| 177921 ||  || — || September 30, 2005 || Mount Lemmon || Mount Lemmon Survey || — || align=right | 5.3 km || 
|-id=922 bgcolor=#d6d6d6
| 177922 ||  || — || September 30, 2005 || Mount Lemmon || Mount Lemmon Survey || EOS || align=right | 2.6 km || 
|-id=923 bgcolor=#d6d6d6
| 177923 ||  || — || September 30, 2005 || Mount Lemmon || Mount Lemmon Survey || THM || align=right | 3.5 km || 
|-id=924 bgcolor=#d6d6d6
| 177924 ||  || — || September 30, 2005 || Kitt Peak || Spacewatch || HYG || align=right | 4.4 km || 
|-id=925 bgcolor=#d6d6d6
| 177925 ||  || — || September 24, 2005 || Palomar || NEAT || — || align=right | 6.6 km || 
|-id=926 bgcolor=#d6d6d6
| 177926 ||  || — || September 23, 2005 || Catalina || CSS || EOS || align=right | 2.7 km || 
|-id=927 bgcolor=#d6d6d6
| 177927 ||  || — || September 25, 2005 || Catalina || CSS || EOS || align=right | 4.1 km || 
|-id=928 bgcolor=#d6d6d6
| 177928 ||  || — || September 23, 2005 || Kitt Peak || Spacewatch || EOS || align=right | 2.5 km || 
|-id=929 bgcolor=#E9E9E9
| 177929 ||  || — || October 1, 2005 || Catalina || CSS || MRX || align=right | 1.7 km || 
|-id=930 bgcolor=#E9E9E9
| 177930 ||  || — || October 5, 2005 || Socorro || LINEAR || — || align=right | 3.6 km || 
|-id=931 bgcolor=#d6d6d6
| 177931 ||  || — || October 1, 2005 || Kitt Peak || Spacewatch || — || align=right | 5.3 km || 
|-id=932 bgcolor=#d6d6d6
| 177932 ||  || — || October 7, 2005 || Anderson Mesa || LONEOS || — || align=right | 5.2 km || 
|-id=933 bgcolor=#E9E9E9
| 177933 ||  || — || October 3, 2005 || Catalina || CSS || — || align=right | 2.6 km || 
|-id=934 bgcolor=#d6d6d6
| 177934 ||  || — || October 7, 2005 || Catalina || CSS || — || align=right | 4.7 km || 
|-id=935 bgcolor=#d6d6d6
| 177935 ||  || — || October 7, 2005 || Kitt Peak || Spacewatch || HYG || align=right | 3.8 km || 
|-id=936 bgcolor=#d6d6d6
| 177936 ||  || — || October 21, 2005 || Palomar || NEAT || — || align=right | 4.8 km || 
|-id=937 bgcolor=#d6d6d6
| 177937 ||  || — || October 23, 2005 || Catalina || CSS || — || align=right | 6.9 km || 
|-id=938 bgcolor=#d6d6d6
| 177938 ||  || — || October 24, 2005 || Kitt Peak || Spacewatch || — || align=right | 4.6 km || 
|-id=939 bgcolor=#d6d6d6
| 177939 ||  || — || October 25, 2005 || Mount Lemmon || Mount Lemmon Survey || — || align=right | 3.4 km || 
|-id=940 bgcolor=#d6d6d6
| 177940 ||  || — || October 26, 2005 || Kitt Peak || Spacewatch || SHU3:2 || align=right | 7.6 km || 
|-id=941 bgcolor=#d6d6d6
| 177941 ||  || — || October 27, 2005 || Kitt Peak || Spacewatch || 3:2 || align=right | 6.7 km || 
|-id=942 bgcolor=#d6d6d6
| 177942 ||  || — || November 4, 2005 || Mount Lemmon || Mount Lemmon Survey || — || align=right | 5.6 km || 
|-id=943 bgcolor=#d6d6d6
| 177943 ||  || — || November 1, 2005 || Kitt Peak || Spacewatch || SHU3:2 || align=right | 10 km || 
|-id=944 bgcolor=#d6d6d6
| 177944 ||  || — || November 1, 2005 || Mount Lemmon || Mount Lemmon Survey || — || align=right | 3.7 km || 
|-id=945 bgcolor=#E9E9E9
| 177945 ||  || — || November 25, 2005 || Palomar || NEAT || — || align=right | 4.7 km || 
|-id=946 bgcolor=#d6d6d6
| 177946 ||  || — || November 25, 2005 || Mount Lemmon || Mount Lemmon Survey || — || align=right | 4.9 km || 
|-id=947 bgcolor=#fefefe
| 177947 ||  || — || May 1, 2006 || Kitt Peak || Spacewatch || — || align=right | 1.2 km || 
|-id=948 bgcolor=#fefefe
| 177948 || 2006 KV || — || May 18, 2006 || Palomar || NEAT || NYS || align=right data-sort-value="0.91" | 910 m || 
|-id=949 bgcolor=#fefefe
| 177949 ||  || — || May 25, 2006 || Kitt Peak || Spacewatch || V || align=right | 1.2 km || 
|-id=950 bgcolor=#fefefe
| 177950 ||  || — || May 25, 2006 || Mount Lemmon || Mount Lemmon Survey || FLO || align=right data-sort-value="0.92" | 920 m || 
|-id=951 bgcolor=#fefefe
| 177951 ||  || — || May 24, 2006 || Catalina || CSS || H || align=right | 1.1 km || 
|-id=952 bgcolor=#fefefe
| 177952 ||  || — || May 25, 2006 || Catalina || CSS || — || align=right | 2.1 km || 
|-id=953 bgcolor=#FA8072
| 177953 ||  || — || June 20, 2006 || Catalina || CSS || — || align=right | 1.3 km || 
|-id=954 bgcolor=#E9E9E9
| 177954 || 2006 OA || — || July 16, 2006 || Eskridge || D. Tibbets, G. Hug || EUN || align=right | 1.8 km || 
|-id=955 bgcolor=#d6d6d6
| 177955 ||  || — || July 21, 2006 || Mount Lemmon || Mount Lemmon Survey || — || align=right | 4.6 km || 
|-id=956 bgcolor=#fefefe
| 177956 ||  || — || July 19, 2006 || Palomar || NEAT || FLO || align=right | 1.1 km || 
|-id=957 bgcolor=#fefefe
| 177957 ||  || — || July 21, 2006 || Palomar || NEAT || — || align=right | 1.0 km || 
|-id=958 bgcolor=#fefefe
| 177958 ||  || — || August 14, 2006 || Reedy Creek || J. Broughton || — || align=right | 1.3 km || 
|-id=959 bgcolor=#fefefe
| 177959 ||  || — || August 12, 2006 || Palomar || NEAT || — || align=right data-sort-value="0.78" | 780 m || 
|-id=960 bgcolor=#fefefe
| 177960 ||  || — || August 12, 2006 || Palomar || NEAT || — || align=right | 1.0 km || 
|-id=961 bgcolor=#fefefe
| 177961 ||  || — || August 13, 2006 || Palomar || NEAT || — || align=right | 1.4 km || 
|-id=962 bgcolor=#E9E9E9
| 177962 ||  || — || August 15, 2006 || Palomar || NEAT || — || align=right | 3.5 km || 
|-id=963 bgcolor=#fefefe
| 177963 ||  || — || August 15, 2006 || Palomar || NEAT || — || align=right | 1.2 km || 
|-id=964 bgcolor=#fefefe
| 177964 ||  || — || August 13, 2006 || Palomar || NEAT || — || align=right data-sort-value="0.84" | 840 m || 
|-id=965 bgcolor=#fefefe
| 177965 ||  || — || August 14, 2006 || Siding Spring || SSS || V || align=right | 1.3 km || 
|-id=966 bgcolor=#fefefe
| 177966 ||  || — || August 15, 2006 || Palomar || NEAT || — || align=right | 1.00 km || 
|-id=967 bgcolor=#fefefe
| 177967 Chouchihkang ||  ||  || August 15, 2006 || Lulin Observatory || H.-C. Lin, Q.-z. Ye || V || align=right data-sort-value="0.89" | 890 m || 
|-id=968 bgcolor=#E9E9E9
| 177968 ||  || — || August 14, 2006 || Palomar || NEAT || — || align=right | 2.4 km || 
|-id=969 bgcolor=#E9E9E9
| 177969 ||  || — || August 14, 2006 || Palomar || NEAT || — || align=right | 1.5 km || 
|-id=970 bgcolor=#E9E9E9
| 177970 ||  || — || August 14, 2006 || Palomar || NEAT || — || align=right | 1.7 km || 
|-id=971 bgcolor=#fefefe
| 177971 || 2006 QC || — || August 17, 2006 || Hibiscus || S. F. Hönig || — || align=right | 1.0 km || 
|-id=972 bgcolor=#E9E9E9
| 177972 ||  || — || August 17, 2006 || Palomar || NEAT || — || align=right | 2.9 km || 
|-id=973 bgcolor=#E9E9E9
| 177973 ||  || — || August 18, 2006 || Kitt Peak || Spacewatch || — || align=right | 3.0 km || 
|-id=974 bgcolor=#fefefe
| 177974 ||  || — || August 19, 2006 || Kitt Peak || Spacewatch || V || align=right data-sort-value="0.97" | 970 m || 
|-id=975 bgcolor=#E9E9E9
| 177975 ||  || — || August 17, 2006 || Palomar || NEAT || MAR || align=right | 1.7 km || 
|-id=976 bgcolor=#fefefe
| 177976 ||  || — || August 18, 2006 || Anderson Mesa || LONEOS || — || align=right | 1.6 km || 
|-id=977 bgcolor=#E9E9E9
| 177977 ||  || — || August 18, 2006 || Anderson Mesa || LONEOS || — || align=right | 3.2 km || 
|-id=978 bgcolor=#fefefe
| 177978 ||  || — || August 19, 2006 || Palomar || NEAT || — || align=right | 1.3 km || 
|-id=979 bgcolor=#E9E9E9
| 177979 ||  || — || August 17, 2006 || Palomar || NEAT || XIZ || align=right | 2.4 km || 
|-id=980 bgcolor=#E9E9E9
| 177980 ||  || — || August 20, 2006 || Kitt Peak || Spacewatch || — || align=right | 1.4 km || 
|-id=981 bgcolor=#fefefe
| 177981 ||  || — || August 21, 2006 || Socorro || LINEAR || — || align=right | 1.4 km || 
|-id=982 bgcolor=#fefefe
| 177982 Popilnia ||  ||  || August 17, 2006 || Andrushivka || Andrushivka Obs. || NYS || align=right data-sort-value="0.96" | 960 m || 
|-id=983 bgcolor=#d6d6d6
| 177983 ||  || — || August 17, 2006 || Palomar || NEAT || — || align=right | 5.3 km || 
|-id=984 bgcolor=#fefefe
| 177984 ||  || — || August 17, 2006 || Palomar || NEAT || — || align=right | 1.2 km || 
|-id=985 bgcolor=#fefefe
| 177985 ||  || — || August 17, 2006 || Palomar || NEAT || V || align=right data-sort-value="0.96" | 960 m || 
|-id=986 bgcolor=#fefefe
| 177986 ||  || — || August 18, 2006 || Kitt Peak || Spacewatch || MAS || align=right | 1.4 km || 
|-id=987 bgcolor=#fefefe
| 177987 ||  || — || August 18, 2006 || Kitt Peak || Spacewatch || NYS || align=right data-sort-value="0.82" | 820 m || 
|-id=988 bgcolor=#E9E9E9
| 177988 ||  || — || August 19, 2006 || Anderson Mesa || LONEOS || — || align=right | 2.8 km || 
|-id=989 bgcolor=#fefefe
| 177989 ||  || — || August 20, 2006 || Palomar || NEAT || V || align=right | 1.2 km || 
|-id=990 bgcolor=#fefefe
| 177990 ||  || — || August 21, 2006 || Socorro || LINEAR || — || align=right | 1.3 km || 
|-id=991 bgcolor=#fefefe
| 177991 ||  || — || August 21, 2006 || Kitt Peak || Spacewatch || — || align=right data-sort-value="0.98" | 980 m || 
|-id=992 bgcolor=#E9E9E9
| 177992 ||  || — || August 21, 2006 || Kitt Peak || Spacewatch || DOR || align=right | 3.6 km || 
|-id=993 bgcolor=#d6d6d6
| 177993 ||  || — || August 24, 2006 || Socorro || LINEAR || — || align=right | 9.1 km || 
|-id=994 bgcolor=#fefefe
| 177994 ||  || — || August 24, 2006 || Socorro || LINEAR || — || align=right | 1.3 km || 
|-id=995 bgcolor=#fefefe
| 177995 ||  || — || August 28, 2006 || Socorro || LINEAR || H || align=right | 1.0 km || 
|-id=996 bgcolor=#E9E9E9
| 177996 ||  || — || August 21, 2006 || Kitt Peak || Spacewatch || — || align=right | 1.1 km || 
|-id=997 bgcolor=#fefefe
| 177997 ||  || — || August 27, 2006 || Kitt Peak || Spacewatch || — || align=right | 1.5 km || 
|-id=998 bgcolor=#fefefe
| 177998 ||  || — || August 24, 2006 || Socorro || LINEAR || FLO || align=right data-sort-value="0.95" | 950 m || 
|-id=999 bgcolor=#E9E9E9
| 177999 ||  || — || August 27, 2006 || Anderson Mesa || LONEOS || — || align=right | 2.0 km || 
|-id=000 bgcolor=#E9E9E9
| 178000 ||  || — || August 27, 2006 || Anderson Mesa || LONEOS || — || align=right | 3.1 km || 
|}

References

External links 
 Discovery Circumstances: Numbered Minor Planets (175001)–(180000) (IAU Minor Planet Center)

0177